

63001–63100 

|-bgcolor=#E9E9E9
| 63001 ||  || — || November 20, 2000 || Socorro || LINEAR || — || align=right | 4.1 km || 
|-id=002 bgcolor=#d6d6d6
| 63002 ||  || — || November 20, 2000 || Socorro || LINEAR || — || align=right | 5.5 km || 
|-id=003 bgcolor=#d6d6d6
| 63003 ||  || — || November 20, 2000 || Socorro || LINEAR || — || align=right | 6.5 km || 
|-id=004 bgcolor=#d6d6d6
| 63004 ||  || — || November 20, 2000 || Socorro || LINEAR || NAE || align=right | 6.5 km || 
|-id=005 bgcolor=#d6d6d6
| 63005 ||  || — || November 20, 2000 || Socorro || LINEAR || — || align=right | 6.5 km || 
|-id=006 bgcolor=#d6d6d6
| 63006 ||  || — || November 20, 2000 || Socorro || LINEAR || — || align=right | 4.0 km || 
|-id=007 bgcolor=#d6d6d6
| 63007 ||  || — || November 20, 2000 || Socorro || LINEAR || — || align=right | 9.8 km || 
|-id=008 bgcolor=#d6d6d6
| 63008 ||  || — || November 20, 2000 || Socorro || LINEAR || — || align=right | 8.4 km || 
|-id=009 bgcolor=#d6d6d6
| 63009 ||  || — || November 20, 2000 || Socorro || LINEAR || BRA || align=right | 5.3 km || 
|-id=010 bgcolor=#d6d6d6
| 63010 ||  || — || November 20, 2000 || Socorro || LINEAR || — || align=right | 4.1 km || 
|-id=011 bgcolor=#fefefe
| 63011 ||  || — || November 20, 2000 || Socorro || LINEAR || FLO || align=right | 1.6 km || 
|-id=012 bgcolor=#fefefe
| 63012 ||  || — || November 20, 2000 || Socorro || LINEAR || V || align=right | 1.7 km || 
|-id=013 bgcolor=#fefefe
| 63013 ||  || — || November 20, 2000 || Socorro || LINEAR || V || align=right | 1.9 km || 
|-id=014 bgcolor=#fefefe
| 63014 ||  || — || November 20, 2000 || Socorro || LINEAR || — || align=right | 3.1 km || 
|-id=015 bgcolor=#d6d6d6
| 63015 ||  || — || November 20, 2000 || Socorro || LINEAR || — || align=right | 9.2 km || 
|-id=016 bgcolor=#d6d6d6
| 63016 ||  || — || November 20, 2000 || Socorro || LINEAR || EOS || align=right | 4.9 km || 
|-id=017 bgcolor=#E9E9E9
| 63017 ||  || — || November 20, 2000 || Socorro || LINEAR || — || align=right | 7.1 km || 
|-id=018 bgcolor=#d6d6d6
| 63018 ||  || — || November 20, 2000 || Socorro || LINEAR || — || align=right | 6.4 km || 
|-id=019 bgcolor=#E9E9E9
| 63019 ||  || — || November 21, 2000 || Socorro || LINEAR || — || align=right | 3.4 km || 
|-id=020 bgcolor=#fefefe
| 63020 ||  || — || November 21, 2000 || Socorro || LINEAR || — || align=right | 2.0 km || 
|-id=021 bgcolor=#d6d6d6
| 63021 ||  || — || November 21, 2000 || Socorro || LINEAR || — || align=right | 5.3 km || 
|-id=022 bgcolor=#d6d6d6
| 63022 ||  || — || November 21, 2000 || Socorro || LINEAR || HYG || align=right | 7.1 km || 
|-id=023 bgcolor=#fefefe
| 63023 ||  || — || November 21, 2000 || Socorro || LINEAR || — || align=right | 2.0 km || 
|-id=024 bgcolor=#E9E9E9
| 63024 ||  || — || November 21, 2000 || Socorro || LINEAR || DOR || align=right | 5.3 km || 
|-id=025 bgcolor=#d6d6d6
| 63025 ||  || — || November 27, 2000 || Kitt Peak || Spacewatch || — || align=right | 6.2 km || 
|-id=026 bgcolor=#fefefe
| 63026 ||  || — || November 20, 2000 || Socorro || LINEAR || FLO || align=right | 2.4 km || 
|-id=027 bgcolor=#fefefe
| 63027 ||  || — || November 21, 2000 || Socorro || LINEAR || FLO || align=right | 1.8 km || 
|-id=028 bgcolor=#d6d6d6
| 63028 ||  || — || November 21, 2000 || Socorro || LINEAR || — || align=right | 9.2 km || 
|-id=029 bgcolor=#d6d6d6
| 63029 ||  || — || November 21, 2000 || Socorro || LINEAR || URS || align=right | 6.8 km || 
|-id=030 bgcolor=#d6d6d6
| 63030 ||  || — || November 21, 2000 || Socorro || LINEAR || — || align=right | 4.6 km || 
|-id=031 bgcolor=#d6d6d6
| 63031 ||  || — || November 26, 2000 || Socorro || LINEAR || EOS || align=right | 5.1 km || 
|-id=032 bgcolor=#d6d6d6
| 63032 Billschmitt ||  ||  || November 28, 2000 || Fountain Hills || C. W. Juels || — || align=right | 5.5 km || 
|-id=033 bgcolor=#E9E9E9
| 63033 ||  || — || November 28, 2000 || Kitt Peak || Spacewatch || DOR || align=right | 6.1 km || 
|-id=034 bgcolor=#d6d6d6
| 63034 ||  || — || November 20, 2000 || Anderson Mesa || LONEOS || — || align=right | 6.5 km || 
|-id=035 bgcolor=#d6d6d6
| 63035 ||  || — || November 29, 2000 || Kitt Peak || Kitt Peak Obs. || — || align=right | 5.2 km || 
|-id=036 bgcolor=#E9E9E9
| 63036 ||  || — || November 19, 2000 || Socorro || LINEAR || — || align=right | 4.1 km || 
|-id=037 bgcolor=#fefefe
| 63037 ||  || — || November 19, 2000 || Socorro || LINEAR || — || align=right | 1.7 km || 
|-id=038 bgcolor=#d6d6d6
| 63038 ||  || — || November 19, 2000 || Socorro || LINEAR || — || align=right | 4.7 km || 
|-id=039 bgcolor=#d6d6d6
| 63039 ||  || — || November 19, 2000 || Socorro || LINEAR || — || align=right | 4.3 km || 
|-id=040 bgcolor=#d6d6d6
| 63040 ||  || — || November 20, 2000 || Socorro || LINEAR || EOS || align=right | 5.0 km || 
|-id=041 bgcolor=#d6d6d6
| 63041 ||  || — || November 20, 2000 || Socorro || LINEAR || — || align=right | 6.9 km || 
|-id=042 bgcolor=#d6d6d6
| 63042 ||  || — || November 20, 2000 || Socorro || LINEAR || — || align=right | 5.1 km || 
|-id=043 bgcolor=#fefefe
| 63043 ||  || — || November 20, 2000 || Socorro || LINEAR || — || align=right | 2.4 km || 
|-id=044 bgcolor=#fefefe
| 63044 ||  || — || November 20, 2000 || Socorro || LINEAR || NYS || align=right | 1.7 km || 
|-id=045 bgcolor=#d6d6d6
| 63045 ||  || — || November 21, 2000 || Socorro || LINEAR || HYG || align=right | 6.6 km || 
|-id=046 bgcolor=#d6d6d6
| 63046 ||  || — || November 21, 2000 || Socorro || LINEAR || — || align=right | 7.0 km || 
|-id=047 bgcolor=#E9E9E9
| 63047 ||  || — || November 21, 2000 || Socorro || LINEAR || — || align=right | 2.2 km || 
|-id=048 bgcolor=#d6d6d6
| 63048 ||  || — || November 21, 2000 || Socorro || LINEAR || — || align=right | 7.6 km || 
|-id=049 bgcolor=#d6d6d6
| 63049 ||  || — || November 21, 2000 || Socorro || LINEAR || KOR || align=right | 3.5 km || 
|-id=050 bgcolor=#d6d6d6
| 63050 ||  || — || November 21, 2000 || Socorro || LINEAR || SYL7:4 || align=right | 9.9 km || 
|-id=051 bgcolor=#E9E9E9
| 63051 ||  || — || November 21, 2000 || Socorro || LINEAR || — || align=right | 3.8 km || 
|-id=052 bgcolor=#E9E9E9
| 63052 ||  || — || November 21, 2000 || Socorro || LINEAR || — || align=right | 4.0 km || 
|-id=053 bgcolor=#E9E9E9
| 63053 ||  || — || November 21, 2000 || Socorro || LINEAR || — || align=right | 3.1 km || 
|-id=054 bgcolor=#E9E9E9
| 63054 ||  || — || November 21, 2000 || Socorro || LINEAR || — || align=right | 6.4 km || 
|-id=055 bgcolor=#d6d6d6
| 63055 ||  || — || November 20, 2000 || Socorro || LINEAR || CHA || align=right | 5.3 km || 
|-id=056 bgcolor=#d6d6d6
| 63056 ||  || — || November 20, 2000 || Socorro || LINEAR || URS || align=right | 12 km || 
|-id=057 bgcolor=#fefefe
| 63057 ||  || — || November 20, 2000 || Socorro || LINEAR || — || align=right | 2.2 km || 
|-id=058 bgcolor=#E9E9E9
| 63058 ||  || — || November 20, 2000 || Socorro || LINEAR || — || align=right | 5.6 km || 
|-id=059 bgcolor=#E9E9E9
| 63059 ||  || — || November 20, 2000 || Socorro || LINEAR || — || align=right | 6.1 km || 
|-id=060 bgcolor=#E9E9E9
| 63060 ||  || — || November 20, 2000 || Socorro || LINEAR || — || align=right | 3.1 km || 
|-id=061 bgcolor=#E9E9E9
| 63061 ||  || — || November 20, 2000 || Socorro || LINEAR || — || align=right | 3.2 km || 
|-id=062 bgcolor=#E9E9E9
| 63062 ||  || — || November 20, 2000 || Socorro || LINEAR || — || align=right | 6.6 km || 
|-id=063 bgcolor=#E9E9E9
| 63063 ||  || — || November 20, 2000 || Socorro || LINEAR || — || align=right | 3.4 km || 
|-id=064 bgcolor=#d6d6d6
| 63064 ||  || — || November 21, 2000 || Socorro || LINEAR || — || align=right | 6.7 km || 
|-id=065 bgcolor=#E9E9E9
| 63065 ||  || — || November 26, 2000 || Socorro || LINEAR || — || align=right | 3.4 km || 
|-id=066 bgcolor=#d6d6d6
| 63066 ||  || — || November 29, 2000 || Socorro || LINEAR || EOS || align=right | 4.0 km || 
|-id=067 bgcolor=#E9E9E9
| 63067 ||  || — || November 29, 2000 || Socorro || LINEAR || — || align=right | 7.6 km || 
|-id=068 bgcolor=#d6d6d6
| 63068 Moraes ||  ||  || November 23, 2000 || Shishikui || H. Maeno || Tj (2.97) || align=right | 7.3 km || 
|-id=069 bgcolor=#d6d6d6
| 63069 ||  || — || November 27, 2000 || Socorro || LINEAR || — || align=right | 6.6 km || 
|-id=070 bgcolor=#d6d6d6
| 63070 ||  || — || November 27, 2000 || Socorro || LINEAR || — || align=right | 4.9 km || 
|-id=071 bgcolor=#d6d6d6
| 63071 ||  || — || November 29, 2000 || Socorro || LINEAR || — || align=right | 7.3 km || 
|-id=072 bgcolor=#fefefe
| 63072 ||  || — || November 29, 2000 || Socorro || LINEAR || — || align=right | 2.1 km || 
|-id=073 bgcolor=#E9E9E9
| 63073 ||  || — || November 30, 2000 || Socorro || LINEAR || — || align=right | 2.6 km || 
|-id=074 bgcolor=#d6d6d6
| 63074 ||  || — || November 30, 2000 || Socorro || LINEAR || — || align=right | 7.1 km || 
|-id=075 bgcolor=#d6d6d6
| 63075 ||  || — || November 30, 2000 || Socorro || LINEAR || — || align=right | 3.8 km || 
|-id=076 bgcolor=#d6d6d6
| 63076 ||  || — || November 18, 2000 || Socorro || LINEAR || — || align=right | 8.5 km || 
|-id=077 bgcolor=#E9E9E9
| 63077 ||  || — || November 19, 2000 || Kitt Peak || Spacewatch || AGN || align=right | 2.7 km || 
|-id=078 bgcolor=#d6d6d6
| 63078 ||  || — || November 19, 2000 || Socorro || LINEAR || — || align=right | 4.5 km || 
|-id=079 bgcolor=#E9E9E9
| 63079 ||  || — || November 20, 2000 || Anderson Mesa || LONEOS || — || align=right | 2.6 km || 
|-id=080 bgcolor=#d6d6d6
| 63080 ||  || — || November 19, 2000 || Socorro || LINEAR || — || align=right | 8.8 km || 
|-id=081 bgcolor=#fefefe
| 63081 ||  || — || November 19, 2000 || Socorro || LINEAR || — || align=right | 4.7 km || 
|-id=082 bgcolor=#E9E9E9
| 63082 ||  || — || November 19, 2000 || Socorro || LINEAR || GEF || align=right | 3.6 km || 
|-id=083 bgcolor=#d6d6d6
| 63083 ||  || — || November 19, 2000 || Socorro || LINEAR || — || align=right | 5.0 km || 
|-id=084 bgcolor=#d6d6d6
| 63084 ||  || — || November 19, 2000 || Socorro || LINEAR || — || align=right | 6.2 km || 
|-id=085 bgcolor=#d6d6d6
| 63085 ||  || — || November 19, 2000 || Socorro || LINEAR || — || align=right | 7.3 km || 
|-id=086 bgcolor=#d6d6d6
| 63086 ||  || — || November 19, 2000 || Socorro || LINEAR || — || align=right | 11 km || 
|-id=087 bgcolor=#d6d6d6
| 63087 ||  || — || November 20, 2000 || Anderson Mesa || LONEOS || — || align=right | 12 km || 
|-id=088 bgcolor=#d6d6d6
| 63088 ||  || — || November 21, 2000 || Socorro || LINEAR || — || align=right | 8.3 km || 
|-id=089 bgcolor=#E9E9E9
| 63089 ||  || — || November 21, 2000 || Socorro || LINEAR || NEM || align=right | 4.8 km || 
|-id=090 bgcolor=#fefefe
| 63090 ||  || — || November 21, 2000 || Socorro || LINEAR || — || align=right | 1.2 km || 
|-id=091 bgcolor=#d6d6d6
| 63091 ||  || — || November 20, 2000 || Anderson Mesa || LONEOS || — || align=right | 9.5 km || 
|-id=092 bgcolor=#d6d6d6
| 63092 ||  || — || November 20, 2000 || Anderson Mesa || LONEOS || — || align=right | 5.6 km || 
|-id=093 bgcolor=#d6d6d6
| 63093 ||  || — || November 20, 2000 || Anderson Mesa || LONEOS || — || align=right | 3.8 km || 
|-id=094 bgcolor=#d6d6d6
| 63094 ||  || — || November 20, 2000 || Anderson Mesa || LONEOS || — || align=right | 8.9 km || 
|-id=095 bgcolor=#E9E9E9
| 63095 ||  || — || November 20, 2000 || Anderson Mesa || LONEOS || — || align=right | 3.4 km || 
|-id=096 bgcolor=#E9E9E9
| 63096 ||  || — || November 20, 2000 || Anderson Mesa || LONEOS || — || align=right | 4.3 km || 
|-id=097 bgcolor=#d6d6d6
| 63097 ||  || — || November 20, 2000 || Anderson Mesa || LONEOS || — || align=right | 3.5 km || 
|-id=098 bgcolor=#d6d6d6
| 63098 ||  || — || November 23, 2000 || Haleakala || NEAT || — || align=right | 4.9 km || 
|-id=099 bgcolor=#d6d6d6
| 63099 ||  || — || November 23, 2000 || Haleakala || NEAT || — || align=right | 9.2 km || 
|-id=100 bgcolor=#d6d6d6
| 63100 ||  || — || November 23, 2000 || Haleakala || NEAT || — || align=right | 8.0 km || 
|}

63101–63200 

|-bgcolor=#E9E9E9
| 63101 ||  || — || November 25, 2000 || Haleakala || NEAT || HNS || align=right | 5.1 km || 
|-id=102 bgcolor=#d6d6d6
| 63102 ||  || — || November 29, 2000 || Haleakala || NEAT || — || align=right | 7.7 km || 
|-id=103 bgcolor=#d6d6d6
| 63103 ||  || — || November 22, 2000 || Haleakala || NEAT || — || align=right | 6.9 km || 
|-id=104 bgcolor=#E9E9E9
| 63104 ||  || — || November 29, 2000 || Haleakala || NEAT || ADE || align=right | 7.1 km || 
|-id=105 bgcolor=#d6d6d6
| 63105 ||  || — || November 29, 2000 || Haleakala || NEAT || — || align=right | 3.1 km || 
|-id=106 bgcolor=#E9E9E9
| 63106 ||  || — || November 25, 2000 || Socorro || LINEAR || — || align=right | 2.2 km || 
|-id=107 bgcolor=#d6d6d6
| 63107 ||  || — || November 29, 2000 || Socorro || LINEAR || — || align=right | 5.2 km || 
|-id=108 bgcolor=#d6d6d6
| 63108 ||  || — || November 30, 2000 || Socorro || LINEAR || EOS || align=right | 5.1 km || 
|-id=109 bgcolor=#d6d6d6
| 63109 ||  || — || November 30, 2000 || Socorro || LINEAR || EOS || align=right | 4.4 km || 
|-id=110 bgcolor=#E9E9E9
| 63110 ||  || — || November 30, 2000 || Haleakala || NEAT || — || align=right | 4.7 km || 
|-id=111 bgcolor=#d6d6d6
| 63111 ||  || — || November 20, 2000 || Anderson Mesa || LONEOS || — || align=right | 8.5 km || 
|-id=112 bgcolor=#d6d6d6
| 63112 ||  || — || November 20, 2000 || Anderson Mesa || LONEOS || — || align=right | 6.8 km || 
|-id=113 bgcolor=#d6d6d6
| 63113 ||  || — || November 20, 2000 || Anderson Mesa || LONEOS || — || align=right | 5.2 km || 
|-id=114 bgcolor=#E9E9E9
| 63114 ||  || — || November 21, 2000 || Socorro || LINEAR || — || align=right | 2.6 km || 
|-id=115 bgcolor=#fefefe
| 63115 ||  || — || November 23, 2000 || Haleakala || NEAT || — || align=right | 4.7 km || 
|-id=116 bgcolor=#E9E9E9
| 63116 ||  || — || November 23, 2000 || Haleakala || NEAT || — || align=right | 3.5 km || 
|-id=117 bgcolor=#d6d6d6
| 63117 ||  || — || November 26, 2000 || Desert Beaver || W. K. Y. Yeung || — || align=right | 8.4 km || 
|-id=118 bgcolor=#d6d6d6
| 63118 ||  || — || November 25, 2000 || Socorro || LINEAR || TIR || align=right | 7.2 km || 
|-id=119 bgcolor=#E9E9E9
| 63119 ||  || — || November 25, 2000 || Socorro || LINEAR || EUN || align=right | 3.5 km || 
|-id=120 bgcolor=#E9E9E9
| 63120 ||  || — || November 25, 2000 || Anderson Mesa || LONEOS || EUN || align=right | 3.3 km || 
|-id=121 bgcolor=#d6d6d6
| 63121 ||  || — || November 25, 2000 || Anderson Mesa || LONEOS || — || align=right | 11 km || 
|-id=122 bgcolor=#E9E9E9
| 63122 ||  || — || November 26, 2000 || Socorro || LINEAR || EUN || align=right | 2.8 km || 
|-id=123 bgcolor=#d6d6d6
| 63123 ||  || — || November 26, 2000 || Socorro || LINEAR || — || align=right | 3.9 km || 
|-id=124 bgcolor=#d6d6d6
| 63124 ||  || — || November 26, 2000 || Socorro || LINEAR || — || align=right | 6.5 km || 
|-id=125 bgcolor=#d6d6d6
| 63125 ||  || — || November 26, 2000 || Socorro || LINEAR || — || align=right | 8.7 km || 
|-id=126 bgcolor=#E9E9E9
| 63126 ||  || — || November 25, 2000 || Anderson Mesa || LONEOS || BAR || align=right | 3.1 km || 
|-id=127 bgcolor=#E9E9E9
| 63127 ||  || — || November 25, 2000 || Socorro || LINEAR || EUN || align=right | 2.3 km || 
|-id=128 bgcolor=#d6d6d6
| 63128 ||  || — || November 25, 2000 || Socorro || LINEAR || — || align=right | 6.1 km || 
|-id=129 bgcolor=#d6d6d6
| 63129 Courtemanche ||  ||  || November 30, 2000 || Gnosca || S. Sposetti || KOR || align=right | 2.9 km || 
|-id=130 bgcolor=#fefefe
| 63130 ||  || — || November 30, 2000 || Anderson Mesa || LONEOS || V || align=right | 1.5 km || 
|-id=131 bgcolor=#fefefe
| 63131 ||  || — || November 27, 2000 || Socorro || LINEAR || — || align=right | 2.3 km || 
|-id=132 bgcolor=#d6d6d6
| 63132 ||  || — || November 17, 2000 || Kitt Peak || Spacewatch || — || align=right | 6.0 km || 
|-id=133 bgcolor=#E9E9E9
| 63133 ||  || — || November 18, 2000 || Socorro || LINEAR || — || align=right | 6.5 km || 
|-id=134 bgcolor=#E9E9E9
| 63134 ||  || — || November 18, 2000 || Anderson Mesa || LONEOS || — || align=right | 3.7 km || 
|-id=135 bgcolor=#fefefe
| 63135 ||  || — || November 19, 2000 || Anderson Mesa || LONEOS || — || align=right | 3.6 km || 
|-id=136 bgcolor=#d6d6d6
| 63136 ||  || — || November 19, 2000 || Anderson Mesa || LONEOS || — || align=right | 7.4 km || 
|-id=137 bgcolor=#E9E9E9
| 63137 ||  || — || November 19, 2000 || Anderson Mesa || LONEOS || RAF || align=right | 3.1 km || 
|-id=138 bgcolor=#d6d6d6
| 63138 ||  || — || November 19, 2000 || Anderson Mesa || LONEOS || — || align=right | 6.8 km || 
|-id=139 bgcolor=#d6d6d6
| 63139 ||  || — || November 19, 2000 || Anderson Mesa || LONEOS || EOS || align=right | 3.5 km || 
|-id=140 bgcolor=#E9E9E9
| 63140 ||  || — || November 19, 2000 || Anderson Mesa || LONEOS || — || align=right | 2.7 km || 
|-id=141 bgcolor=#d6d6d6
| 63141 ||  || — || November 19, 2000 || Anderson Mesa || LONEOS || — || align=right | 9.2 km || 
|-id=142 bgcolor=#fefefe
| 63142 || 2000 XZ || — || December 2, 2000 || Haleakala || NEAT || H || align=right | 1.8 km || 
|-id=143 bgcolor=#E9E9E9
| 63143 ||  || — || December 3, 2000 || Kitt Peak || Spacewatch || — || align=right | 2.6 km || 
|-id=144 bgcolor=#d6d6d6
| 63144 ||  || — || December 1, 2000 || Socorro || LINEAR || — || align=right | 4.8 km || 
|-id=145 bgcolor=#d6d6d6
| 63145 Choemuseon ||  ||  || December 4, 2000 || Bohyunsan || Y.-B. Jeon, B.-C. Lee || THM || align=right | 5.9 km || 
|-id=146 bgcolor=#d6d6d6
| 63146 ||  || — || December 1, 2000 || Kitt Peak || Spacewatch || — || align=right | 12 km || 
|-id=147 bgcolor=#d6d6d6
| 63147 ||  || — || December 4, 2000 || Socorro || LINEAR || — || align=right | 4.3 km || 
|-id=148 bgcolor=#d6d6d6
| 63148 ||  || — || December 4, 2000 || Socorro || LINEAR || EOS || align=right | 5.5 km || 
|-id=149 bgcolor=#d6d6d6
| 63149 ||  || — || December 4, 2000 || Socorro || LINEAR || — || align=right | 9.5 km || 
|-id=150 bgcolor=#d6d6d6
| 63150 ||  || — || December 4, 2000 || Socorro || LINEAR || — || align=right | 8.1 km || 
|-id=151 bgcolor=#d6d6d6
| 63151 ||  || — || December 4, 2000 || Socorro || LINEAR || — || align=right | 6.7 km || 
|-id=152 bgcolor=#E9E9E9
| 63152 ||  || — || December 4, 2000 || Socorro || LINEAR || GER || align=right | 4.0 km || 
|-id=153 bgcolor=#fefefe
| 63153 ||  || — || December 4, 2000 || Socorro || LINEAR || V || align=right | 1.7 km || 
|-id=154 bgcolor=#d6d6d6
| 63154 ||  || — || December 5, 2000 || Socorro || LINEAR || — || align=right | 3.7 km || 
|-id=155 bgcolor=#d6d6d6
| 63155 ||  || — || December 5, 2000 || Socorro || LINEAR || — || align=right | 10 km || 
|-id=156 bgcolor=#d6d6d6
| 63156 Yicheon ||  ||  || December 5, 2000 || Bohyunsan || Y.-B. Jeon, B.-C. Lee || EOS || align=right | 5.5 km || 
|-id=157 bgcolor=#fefefe
| 63157 ||  || — || December 19, 2000 || Haleakala || NEAT || — || align=right | 5.8 km || 
|-id=158 bgcolor=#E9E9E9
| 63158 ||  || — || December 20, 2000 || Kitt Peak || Spacewatch || HEN || align=right | 1.7 km || 
|-id=159 bgcolor=#d6d6d6
| 63159 ||  || — || December 20, 2000 || Socorro || LINEAR || — || align=right | 5.7 km || 
|-id=160 bgcolor=#FA8072
| 63160 ||  || — || December 16, 2000 || Uccle || T. Pauwels || — || align=right | 1.9 km || 
|-id=161 bgcolor=#d6d6d6
| 63161 ||  || — || December 22, 2000 || Socorro || LINEAR || — || align=right | 6.3 km || 
|-id=162 bgcolor=#d6d6d6
| 63162 Davidčapek ||  ||  || December 22, 2000 || Ondřejov || P. Pravec, P. Kušnirák || — || align=right | 11 km || 
|-id=163 bgcolor=#fefefe
| 63163 Jerusalem ||  ||  || December 23, 2000 || Kleť || M. Kočer || PHO || align=right | 4.3 km || 
|-id=164 bgcolor=#FA8072
| 63164 ||  || — || December 23, 2000 || Uenohara || Uenohara Obs. || — || align=right | 2.0 km || 
|-id=165 bgcolor=#d6d6d6
| 63165 ||  || — || December 20, 2000 || Uccle || T. Pauwels || EOS || align=right | 5.2 km || 
|-id=166 bgcolor=#d6d6d6
| 63166 ||  || — || December 20, 2000 || Socorro || LINEAR || EOS || align=right | 4.5 km || 
|-id=167 bgcolor=#fefefe
| 63167 ||  || — || December 20, 2000 || Socorro || LINEAR || — || align=right | 3.0 km || 
|-id=168 bgcolor=#fefefe
| 63168 ||  || — || December 25, 2000 || Kitt Peak || Spacewatch || — || align=right | 1.8 km || 
|-id=169 bgcolor=#E9E9E9
| 63169 ||  || — || December 31, 2000 || Kitt Peak || Spacewatch || — || align=right | 2.8 km || 
|-id=170 bgcolor=#fefefe
| 63170 ||  || — || December 29, 2000 || Haleakala || NEAT || — || align=right | 2.2 km || 
|-id=171 bgcolor=#E9E9E9
| 63171 ||  || — || December 30, 2000 || Socorro || LINEAR || — || align=right | 5.7 km || 
|-id=172 bgcolor=#d6d6d6
| 63172 ||  || — || December 30, 2000 || Socorro || LINEAR || — || align=right | 9.0 km || 
|-id=173 bgcolor=#E9E9E9
| 63173 ||  || — || December 30, 2000 || Socorro || LINEAR || — || align=right | 4.7 km || 
|-id=174 bgcolor=#fefefe
| 63174 ||  || — || December 30, 2000 || Socorro || LINEAR || — || align=right | 2.1 km || 
|-id=175 bgcolor=#C2FFFF
| 63175 ||  || — || December 30, 2000 || Socorro || LINEAR || L4 || align=right | 18 km || 
|-id=176 bgcolor=#C2FFFF
| 63176 ||  || — || December 30, 2000 || Socorro || LINEAR || L4 || align=right | 12 km || 
|-id=177 bgcolor=#d6d6d6
| 63177 ||  || — || December 30, 2000 || Socorro || LINEAR || — || align=right | 9.1 km || 
|-id=178 bgcolor=#d6d6d6
| 63178 ||  || — || December 30, 2000 || Socorro || LINEAR || — || align=right | 7.2 km || 
|-id=179 bgcolor=#d6d6d6
| 63179 ||  || — || December 30, 2000 || Socorro || LINEAR || EOS || align=right | 4.2 km || 
|-id=180 bgcolor=#d6d6d6
| 63180 ||  || — || December 30, 2000 || Socorro || LINEAR || EOS || align=right | 4.8 km || 
|-id=181 bgcolor=#d6d6d6
| 63181 ||  || — || December 30, 2000 || Socorro || LINEAR || — || align=right | 5.5 km || 
|-id=182 bgcolor=#E9E9E9
| 63182 ||  || — || December 30, 2000 || Socorro || LINEAR || — || align=right | 2.6 km || 
|-id=183 bgcolor=#d6d6d6
| 63183 ||  || — || December 30, 2000 || Socorro || LINEAR || HYG || align=right | 8.6 km || 
|-id=184 bgcolor=#d6d6d6
| 63184 ||  || — || December 30, 2000 || Socorro || LINEAR || HIL3:2 || align=right | 17 km || 
|-id=185 bgcolor=#d6d6d6
| 63185 ||  || — || December 30, 2000 || Socorro || LINEAR || — || align=right | 5.4 km || 
|-id=186 bgcolor=#d6d6d6
| 63186 ||  || — || December 30, 2000 || Socorro || LINEAR || THM || align=right | 5.7 km || 
|-id=187 bgcolor=#d6d6d6
| 63187 ||  || — || December 30, 2000 || Socorro || LINEAR || — || align=right | 4.2 km || 
|-id=188 bgcolor=#d6d6d6
| 63188 ||  || — || December 30, 2000 || Socorro || LINEAR || — || align=right | 4.6 km || 
|-id=189 bgcolor=#d6d6d6
| 63189 ||  || — || December 30, 2000 || Socorro || LINEAR || BRA || align=right | 4.4 km || 
|-id=190 bgcolor=#d6d6d6
| 63190 ||  || — || December 28, 2000 || Socorro || LINEAR || — || align=right | 7.3 km || 
|-id=191 bgcolor=#E9E9E9
| 63191 ||  || — || December 30, 2000 || Socorro || LINEAR || — || align=right | 3.0 km || 
|-id=192 bgcolor=#E9E9E9
| 63192 ||  || — || December 30, 2000 || Socorro || LINEAR || — || align=right | 5.5 km || 
|-id=193 bgcolor=#C2FFFF
| 63193 ||  || — || December 27, 2000 || Anderson Mesa || LONEOS || L4 || align=right | 16 km || 
|-id=194 bgcolor=#d6d6d6
| 63194 ||  || — || December 19, 2000 || Anderson Mesa || LONEOS || — || align=right | 4.5 km || 
|-id=195 bgcolor=#C2FFFF
| 63195 ||  || — || December 19, 2000 || Socorro || LINEAR || L4 || align=right | 25 km || 
|-id=196 bgcolor=#E9E9E9
| 63196 ||  || — || December 23, 2000 || Socorro || LINEAR || — || align=right | 6.0 km || 
|-id=197 bgcolor=#d6d6d6
| 63197 ||  || — || December 28, 2000 || Socorro || LINEAR || — || align=right | 4.8 km || 
|-id=198 bgcolor=#d6d6d6
| 63198 ||  || — || December 28, 2000 || Socorro || LINEAR || EOS || align=right | 5.4 km || 
|-id=199 bgcolor=#d6d6d6
| 63199 ||  || — || December 28, 2000 || Kitt Peak || Spacewatch || — || align=right | 4.7 km || 
|-id=200 bgcolor=#d6d6d6
| 63200 ||  || — || December 29, 2000 || Anderson Mesa || LONEOS || — || align=right | 12 km || 
|}

63201–63300 

|-bgcolor=#d6d6d6
| 63201 ||  || — || December 29, 2000 || Kitt Peak || Spacewatch || THM || align=right | 6.6 km || 
|-id=202 bgcolor=#C2FFFF
| 63202 ||  || — || December 30, 2000 || Socorro || LINEAR || L4 || align=right | 18 km || 
|-id=203 bgcolor=#d6d6d6
| 63203 ||  || — || December 30, 2000 || Socorro || LINEAR || KOR || align=right | 3.1 km || 
|-id=204 bgcolor=#d6d6d6
| 63204 ||  || — || December 17, 2000 || Anderson Mesa || LONEOS || TEL || align=right | 4.8 km || 
|-id=205 bgcolor=#C2FFFF
| 63205 ||  || — || December 27, 2000 || Kitt Peak || Spacewatch || L4 || align=right | 17 km || 
|-id=206 bgcolor=#E9E9E9
| 63206 ||  || — || December 23, 2000 || Socorro || LINEAR || — || align=right | 4.4 km || 
|-id=207 bgcolor=#fefefe
| 63207 ||  || — || January 2, 2001 || Socorro || LINEAR || V || align=right | 1.5 km || 
|-id=208 bgcolor=#d6d6d6
| 63208 ||  || — || January 2, 2001 || Socorro || LINEAR || — || align=right | 4.8 km || 
|-id=209 bgcolor=#fefefe
| 63209 ||  || — || January 2, 2001 || Socorro || LINEAR || V || align=right | 1.6 km || 
|-id=210 bgcolor=#C2FFFF
| 63210 ||  || — || January 2, 2001 || Socorro || LINEAR || L4 || align=right | 20 km || 
|-id=211 bgcolor=#E9E9E9
| 63211 ||  || — || January 2, 2001 || Socorro || LINEAR || WIT || align=right | 2.6 km || 
|-id=212 bgcolor=#fefefe
| 63212 ||  || — || January 2, 2001 || Socorro || LINEAR || — || align=right | 2.5 km || 
|-id=213 bgcolor=#E9E9E9
| 63213 ||  || — || January 4, 2001 || Haleakala || NEAT || — || align=right | 6.1 km || 
|-id=214 bgcolor=#d6d6d6
| 63214 ||  || — || January 3, 2001 || Socorro || LINEAR || — || align=right | 7.6 km || 
|-id=215 bgcolor=#d6d6d6
| 63215 ||  || — || January 4, 2001 || Socorro || LINEAR || — || align=right | 4.7 km || 
|-id=216 bgcolor=#d6d6d6
| 63216 ||  || — || January 5, 2001 || Socorro || LINEAR || — || align=right | 7.4 km || 
|-id=217 bgcolor=#fefefe
| 63217 ||  || — || January 4, 2001 || Socorro || LINEAR || FLO || align=right | 3.0 km || 
|-id=218 bgcolor=#fefefe
| 63218 ||  || — || January 4, 2001 || Socorro || LINEAR || FLO || align=right | 2.4 km || 
|-id=219 bgcolor=#E9E9E9
| 63219 ||  || — || January 4, 2001 || Socorro || LINEAR || — || align=right | 3.2 km || 
|-id=220 bgcolor=#d6d6d6
| 63220 ||  || — || January 4, 2001 || Socorro || LINEAR || — || align=right | 6.4 km || 
|-id=221 bgcolor=#d6d6d6
| 63221 ||  || — || January 4, 2001 || Socorro || LINEAR || — || align=right | 8.7 km || 
|-id=222 bgcolor=#fefefe
| 63222 ||  || — || January 5, 2001 || Socorro || LINEAR || — || align=right | 2.4 km || 
|-id=223 bgcolor=#E9E9E9
| 63223 ||  || — || January 5, 2001 || Socorro || LINEAR || — || align=right | 3.3 km || 
|-id=224 bgcolor=#d6d6d6
| 63224 ||  || — || January 5, 2001 || Socorro || LINEAR || — || align=right | 10 km || 
|-id=225 bgcolor=#fefefe
| 63225 ||  || — || January 18, 2001 || Haleakala || NEAT || H || align=right | 1.6 km || 
|-id=226 bgcolor=#fefefe
| 63226 ||  || — || January 18, 2001 || Socorro || LINEAR || — || align=right | 1.7 km || 
|-id=227 bgcolor=#d6d6d6
| 63227 ||  || — || January 19, 2001 || Socorro || LINEAR || EOS || align=right | 4.7 km || 
|-id=228 bgcolor=#E9E9E9
| 63228 ||  || — || January 19, 2001 || Socorro || LINEAR || — || align=right | 3.6 km || 
|-id=229 bgcolor=#d6d6d6
| 63229 ||  || — || January 19, 2001 || Socorro || LINEAR || EOS || align=right | 4.4 km || 
|-id=230 bgcolor=#d6d6d6
| 63230 ||  || — || January 21, 2001 || Oizumi || T. Kobayashi || THM || align=right | 5.2 km || 
|-id=231 bgcolor=#C2FFFF
| 63231 ||  || — || January 21, 2001 || Oizumi || T. Kobayashi || L4 || align=right | 19 km || 
|-id=232 bgcolor=#d6d6d6
| 63232 ||  || — || January 21, 2001 || Oizumi || T. Kobayashi || — || align=right | 7.5 km || 
|-id=233 bgcolor=#fefefe
| 63233 ||  || — || January 19, 2001 || Socorro || LINEAR || — || align=right | 1.8 km || 
|-id=234 bgcolor=#C2FFFF
| 63234 ||  || — || January 19, 2001 || Socorro || LINEAR || L4 || align=right | 20 km || 
|-id=235 bgcolor=#d6d6d6
| 63235 ||  || — || January 19, 2001 || Socorro || LINEAR || 7:4 || align=right | 9.1 km || 
|-id=236 bgcolor=#fefefe
| 63236 ||  || — || January 19, 2001 || Socorro || LINEAR || MAS || align=right | 1.8 km || 
|-id=237 bgcolor=#d6d6d6
| 63237 ||  || — || January 20, 2001 || Socorro || LINEAR || — || align=right | 4.8 km || 
|-id=238 bgcolor=#E9E9E9
| 63238 ||  || — || January 20, 2001 || Socorro || LINEAR || — || align=right | 2.5 km || 
|-id=239 bgcolor=#C2FFFF
| 63239 ||  || — || January 20, 2001 || Socorro || LINEAR || L4 || align=right | 19 km || 
|-id=240 bgcolor=#E9E9E9
| 63240 ||  || — || January 20, 2001 || Socorro || LINEAR || — || align=right | 2.6 km || 
|-id=241 bgcolor=#C2FFFF
| 63241 ||  || — || January 20, 2001 || Socorro || LINEAR || L4 || align=right | 23 km || 
|-id=242 bgcolor=#d6d6d6
| 63242 ||  || — || January 20, 2001 || Socorro || LINEAR || 628 || align=right | 3.0 km || 
|-id=243 bgcolor=#E9E9E9
| 63243 ||  || — || January 20, 2001 || Socorro || LINEAR || — || align=right | 2.5 km || 
|-id=244 bgcolor=#fefefe
| 63244 ||  || — || January 20, 2001 || Socorro || LINEAR || NYS || align=right | 1.9 km || 
|-id=245 bgcolor=#d6d6d6
| 63245 ||  || — || January 20, 2001 || Socorro || LINEAR || — || align=right | 4.6 km || 
|-id=246 bgcolor=#E9E9E9
| 63246 ||  || — || January 20, 2001 || Socorro || LINEAR || — || align=right | 2.2 km || 
|-id=247 bgcolor=#fefefe
| 63247 ||  || — || January 20, 2001 || Socorro || LINEAR || FLO || align=right | 1.6 km || 
|-id=248 bgcolor=#E9E9E9
| 63248 ||  || — || January 20, 2001 || Socorro || LINEAR || — || align=right | 5.4 km || 
|-id=249 bgcolor=#d6d6d6
| 63249 ||  || — || January 18, 2001 || Socorro || LINEAR || HIL3:2 || align=right | 15 km || 
|-id=250 bgcolor=#E9E9E9
| 63250 ||  || — || January 21, 2001 || Socorro || LINEAR || CLO || align=right | 4.5 km || 
|-id=251 bgcolor=#d6d6d6
| 63251 ||  || — || January 21, 2001 || Socorro || LINEAR || HYG || align=right | 5.8 km || 
|-id=252 bgcolor=#C7FF8F
| 63252 ||  || — || January 19, 2001 || Kitt Peak || Spacewatch || centaur || align=right | 22 km || 
|-id=253 bgcolor=#E9E9E9
| 63253 ||  || — || January 21, 2001 || Socorro || LINEAR || — || align=right | 3.0 km || 
|-id=254 bgcolor=#fefefe
| 63254 ||  || — || January 19, 2001 || Socorro || LINEAR || — || align=right | 2.8 km || 
|-id=255 bgcolor=#fefefe
| 63255 ||  || — || January 29, 2001 || Socorro || LINEAR || — || align=right | 2.4 km || 
|-id=256 bgcolor=#E9E9E9
| 63256 ||  || — || January 25, 2001 || Haleakala || NEAT || — || align=right | 3.4 km || 
|-id=257 bgcolor=#C2FFFF
| 63257 ||  || — || January 21, 2001 || Socorro || LINEAR || L4 || align=right | 14 km || 
|-id=258 bgcolor=#d6d6d6
| 63258 ||  || — || January 19, 2001 || Haleakala || NEAT || — || align=right | 6.6 km || 
|-id=259 bgcolor=#C2FFFF
| 63259 ||  || — || January 30, 2001 || Bergisch Gladbach || W. Bickel || L4 || align=right | 13 km || 
|-id=260 bgcolor=#fefefe
| 63260 || 2001 CN || — || February 1, 2001 || Socorro || LINEAR || H || align=right | 2.4 km || 
|-id=261 bgcolor=#d6d6d6
| 63261 ||  || — || February 1, 2001 || Socorro || LINEAR || EOS || align=right | 4.4 km || 
|-id=262 bgcolor=#fefefe
| 63262 ||  || — || February 1, 2001 || Socorro || LINEAR || — || align=right | 2.2 km || 
|-id=263 bgcolor=#d6d6d6
| 63263 ||  || — || February 1, 2001 || Socorro || LINEAR || — || align=right | 7.4 km || 
|-id=264 bgcolor=#fefefe
| 63264 ||  || — || February 1, 2001 || Socorro || LINEAR || V || align=right | 1.5 km || 
|-id=265 bgcolor=#C2FFFF
| 63265 ||  || — || February 1, 2001 || Socorro || LINEAR || L4 || align=right | 19 km || 
|-id=266 bgcolor=#d6d6d6
| 63266 ||  || — || February 1, 2001 || Socorro || LINEAR || HYG || align=right | 8.3 km || 
|-id=267 bgcolor=#fefefe
| 63267 ||  || — || February 1, 2001 || Socorro || LINEAR || FLO || align=right | 2.9 km || 
|-id=268 bgcolor=#fefefe
| 63268 ||  || — || February 1, 2001 || Anderson Mesa || LONEOS || — || align=right | 2.0 km || 
|-id=269 bgcolor=#C2FFFF
| 63269 ||  || — || February 1, 2001 || Anderson Mesa || LONEOS || L4 || align=right | 18 km || 
|-id=270 bgcolor=#d6d6d6
| 63270 ||  || — || February 2, 2001 || Anderson Mesa || LONEOS || — || align=right | 7.2 km || 
|-id=271 bgcolor=#E9E9E9
| 63271 ||  || — || February 13, 2001 || Socorro || LINEAR || — || align=right | 6.9 km || 
|-id=272 bgcolor=#C2FFFF
| 63272 ||  || — || February 1, 2001 || Anderson Mesa || LONEOS || L4 || align=right | 19 km || 
|-id=273 bgcolor=#C2FFFF
| 63273 ||  || — || February 16, 2001 || Socorro || LINEAR || L4 || align=right | 30 km || 
|-id=274 bgcolor=#d6d6d6
| 63274 ||  || — || February 16, 2001 || Socorro || LINEAR || — || align=right | 8.4 km || 
|-id=275 bgcolor=#fefefe
| 63275 ||  || — || February 16, 2001 || Socorro || LINEAR || FLO || align=right | 1.7 km || 
|-id=276 bgcolor=#E9E9E9
| 63276 ||  || — || February 17, 2001 || Socorro || LINEAR || EUN || align=right | 4.2 km || 
|-id=277 bgcolor=#E9E9E9
| 63277 ||  || — || February 17, 2001 || Socorro || LINEAR || — || align=right | 2.4 km || 
|-id=278 bgcolor=#C2FFFF
| 63278 ||  || — || February 17, 2001 || Socorro || LINEAR || L4 || align=right | 15 km || 
|-id=279 bgcolor=#C2FFFF
| 63279 ||  || — || February 19, 2001 || Socorro || LINEAR || L4 || align=right | 15 km || 
|-id=280 bgcolor=#d6d6d6
| 63280 ||  || — || February 19, 2001 || Socorro || LINEAR || EOS || align=right | 4.3 km || 
|-id=281 bgcolor=#E9E9E9
| 63281 ||  || — || February 19, 2001 || Socorro || LINEAR || — || align=right | 2.4 km || 
|-id=282 bgcolor=#fefefe
| 63282 ||  || — || February 19, 2001 || Socorro || LINEAR || FLO || align=right | 1.4 km || 
|-id=283 bgcolor=#d6d6d6
| 63283 ||  || — || February 19, 2001 || Socorro || LINEAR || 7:4 || align=right | 5.7 km || 
|-id=284 bgcolor=#C2FFFF
| 63284 ||  || — || February 19, 2001 || Socorro || LINEAR || L4 || align=right | 12 km || 
|-id=285 bgcolor=#d6d6d6
| 63285 ||  || — || February 19, 2001 || Socorro || LINEAR || EOS || align=right | 4.4 km || 
|-id=286 bgcolor=#C2FFFF
| 63286 ||  || — || February 19, 2001 || Socorro || LINEAR || L4 || align=right | 16 km || 
|-id=287 bgcolor=#C2FFFF
| 63287 ||  || — || February 20, 2001 || Haleakala || NEAT || L4 || align=right | 19 km || 
|-id=288 bgcolor=#d6d6d6
| 63288 ||  || — || February 20, 2001 || Haleakala || NEAT || EOS || align=right | 4.4 km || 
|-id=289 bgcolor=#fefefe
| 63289 ||  || — || February 26, 2001 || Oizumi || T. Kobayashi || — || align=right | 2.2 km || 
|-id=290 bgcolor=#C2FFFF
| 63290 ||  || — || February 21, 2001 || Anderson Mesa || LONEOS || L4 || align=right | 19 km || 
|-id=291 bgcolor=#C2FFFF
| 63291 ||  || — || February 16, 2001 || Socorro || LINEAR || L4 || align=right | 13 km || 
|-id=292 bgcolor=#C2FFFF
| 63292 ||  || — || February 22, 2001 || Socorro || LINEAR || L4 || align=right | 18 km || 
|-id=293 bgcolor=#d6d6d6
| 63293 ||  || — || February 22, 2001 || Socorro || LINEAR || 3:2 || align=right | 9.4 km || 
|-id=294 bgcolor=#C2FFFF
| 63294 ||  || — || February 21, 2001 || Kitt Peak || Spacewatch || L4 || align=right | 18 km || 
|-id=295 bgcolor=#fefefe
| 63295 ||  || — || February 16, 2001 || Socorro || LINEAR || — || align=right | 2.1 km || 
|-id=296 bgcolor=#fefefe
| 63296 || 2001 EK || — || March 2, 2001 || Desert Beaver || W. K. Y. Yeung || NYS || align=right | 1.8 km || 
|-id=297 bgcolor=#E9E9E9
| 63297 ||  || — || March 2, 2001 || Anderson Mesa || LONEOS || — || align=right | 3.0 km || 
|-id=298 bgcolor=#fefefe
| 63298 ||  || — || March 2, 2001 || Anderson Mesa || LONEOS || — || align=right | 2.1 km || 
|-id=299 bgcolor=#E9E9E9
| 63299 ||  || — || March 2, 2001 || Anderson Mesa || LONEOS || — || align=right | 5.4 km || 
|-id=300 bgcolor=#fefefe
| 63300 ||  || — || March 2, 2001 || Anderson Mesa || LONEOS || — || align=right | 2.6 km || 
|}

63301–63400 

|-bgcolor=#E9E9E9
| 63301 ||  || — || March 3, 2001 || Socorro || LINEAR || — || align=right | 3.2 km || 
|-id=302 bgcolor=#E9E9E9
| 63302 ||  || — || March 15, 2001 || Socorro || LINEAR || — || align=right | 9.7 km || 
|-id=303 bgcolor=#fefefe
| 63303 ||  || — || March 15, 2001 || Anderson Mesa || LONEOS || NYS || align=right | 1.3 km || 
|-id=304 bgcolor=#E9E9E9
| 63304 ||  || — || March 15, 2001 || Haleakala || NEAT || — || align=right | 4.7 km || 
|-id=305 bgcolor=#d6d6d6
| 63305 Bobkepple || 2001 FE ||  || March 17, 2001 || Junk Bond || D. Healy || HYG || align=right | 6.2 km || 
|-id=306 bgcolor=#fefefe
| 63306 ||  || — || March 18, 2001 || Socorro || LINEAR || — || align=right | 2.5 km || 
|-id=307 bgcolor=#fefefe
| 63307 Barbarawilson ||  ||  || March 21, 2001 || Needville || Needville Obs. || — || align=right | 2.4 km || 
|-id=308 bgcolor=#fefefe
| 63308 ||  || — || March 19, 2001 || Anderson Mesa || LONEOS || NYS || align=right | 1.5 km || 
|-id=309 bgcolor=#fefefe
| 63309 ||  || — || March 19, 2001 || Anderson Mesa || LONEOS || NYS || align=right | 1.7 km || 
|-id=310 bgcolor=#fefefe
| 63310 ||  || — || March 21, 2001 || Anderson Mesa || LONEOS || SUL || align=right | 5.1 km || 
|-id=311 bgcolor=#fefefe
| 63311 ||  || — || March 21, 2001 || Socorro || LINEAR || H || align=right | 1.8 km || 
|-id=312 bgcolor=#d6d6d6
| 63312 ||  || — || March 17, 2001 || Socorro || LINEAR || LIX || align=right | 9.3 km || 
|-id=313 bgcolor=#fefefe
| 63313 ||  || — || March 19, 2001 || Socorro || LINEAR || — || align=right | 6.9 km || 
|-id=314 bgcolor=#E9E9E9
| 63314 ||  || — || March 18, 2001 || Socorro || LINEAR || MAR || align=right | 3.7 km || 
|-id=315 bgcolor=#fefefe
| 63315 ||  || — || March 18, 2001 || Socorro || LINEAR || — || align=right | 1.6 km || 
|-id=316 bgcolor=#d6d6d6
| 63316 ||  || — || March 18, 2001 || Socorro || LINEAR || — || align=right | 7.0 km || 
|-id=317 bgcolor=#fefefe
| 63317 ||  || — || March 18, 2001 || Socorro || LINEAR || NYS || align=right | 1.4 km || 
|-id=318 bgcolor=#E9E9E9
| 63318 ||  || — || March 18, 2001 || Socorro || LINEAR || MIS || align=right | 4.3 km || 
|-id=319 bgcolor=#fefefe
| 63319 ||  || — || March 18, 2001 || Socorro || LINEAR || — || align=right | 1.6 km || 
|-id=320 bgcolor=#d6d6d6
| 63320 ||  || — || March 18, 2001 || Socorro || LINEAR || — || align=right | 6.1 km || 
|-id=321 bgcolor=#E9E9E9
| 63321 ||  || — || March 18, 2001 || Socorro || LINEAR || — || align=right | 3.8 km || 
|-id=322 bgcolor=#fefefe
| 63322 ||  || — || March 18, 2001 || Socorro || LINEAR || — || align=right | 2.0 km || 
|-id=323 bgcolor=#fefefe
| 63323 ||  || — || March 18, 2001 || Socorro || LINEAR || — || align=right | 1.8 km || 
|-id=324 bgcolor=#E9E9E9
| 63324 ||  || — || March 18, 2001 || Socorro || LINEAR || — || align=right | 2.7 km || 
|-id=325 bgcolor=#fefefe
| 63325 ||  || — || March 18, 2001 || Socorro || LINEAR || NYS || align=right | 1.6 km || 
|-id=326 bgcolor=#fefefe
| 63326 ||  || — || March 18, 2001 || Socorro || LINEAR || NYS || align=right | 1.8 km || 
|-id=327 bgcolor=#fefefe
| 63327 ||  || — || March 19, 2001 || Socorro || LINEAR || NYS || align=right | 1.3 km || 
|-id=328 bgcolor=#fefefe
| 63328 ||  || — || March 19, 2001 || Socorro || LINEAR || MAS || align=right | 1.7 km || 
|-id=329 bgcolor=#E9E9E9
| 63329 ||  || — || March 21, 2001 || Socorro || LINEAR || ADE || align=right | 6.0 km || 
|-id=330 bgcolor=#fefefe
| 63330 ||  || — || March 19, 2001 || Socorro || LINEAR || — || align=right | 1.9 km || 
|-id=331 bgcolor=#fefefe
| 63331 ||  || — || March 19, 2001 || Socorro || LINEAR || V || align=right | 1.6 km || 
|-id=332 bgcolor=#fefefe
| 63332 ||  || — || March 19, 2001 || Socorro || LINEAR || — || align=right | 2.6 km || 
|-id=333 bgcolor=#fefefe
| 63333 ||  || — || March 19, 2001 || Socorro || LINEAR || FLO || align=right | 1.4 km || 
|-id=334 bgcolor=#d6d6d6
| 63334 ||  || — || March 19, 2001 || Socorro || LINEAR || — || align=right | 5.6 km || 
|-id=335 bgcolor=#fefefe
| 63335 ||  || — || March 19, 2001 || Socorro || LINEAR || — || align=right | 2.4 km || 
|-id=336 bgcolor=#fefefe
| 63336 ||  || — || March 19, 2001 || Socorro || LINEAR || FLO || align=right | 1.5 km || 
|-id=337 bgcolor=#E9E9E9
| 63337 ||  || — || March 19, 2001 || Socorro || LINEAR || — || align=right | 4.9 km || 
|-id=338 bgcolor=#fefefe
| 63338 ||  || — || March 19, 2001 || Socorro || LINEAR || — || align=right | 2.4 km || 
|-id=339 bgcolor=#E9E9E9
| 63339 ||  || — || March 19, 2001 || Socorro || LINEAR || — || align=right | 1.9 km || 
|-id=340 bgcolor=#fefefe
| 63340 ||  || — || March 19, 2001 || Socorro || LINEAR || V || align=right | 1.5 km || 
|-id=341 bgcolor=#FA8072
| 63341 ||  || — || March 19, 2001 || Socorro || LINEAR || — || align=right | 6.2 km || 
|-id=342 bgcolor=#E9E9E9
| 63342 ||  || — || March 19, 2001 || Socorro || LINEAR || — || align=right | 4.3 km || 
|-id=343 bgcolor=#d6d6d6
| 63343 ||  || — || March 26, 2001 || Kitt Peak || Spacewatch || — || align=right | 5.2 km || 
|-id=344 bgcolor=#E9E9E9
| 63344 ||  || — || March 21, 2001 || Anderson Mesa || LONEOS || — || align=right | 3.2 km || 
|-id=345 bgcolor=#E9E9E9
| 63345 ||  || — || March 26, 2001 || Socorro || LINEAR || — || align=right | 3.7 km || 
|-id=346 bgcolor=#fefefe
| 63346 ||  || — || March 16, 2001 || Socorro || LINEAR || V || align=right | 1.8 km || 
|-id=347 bgcolor=#d6d6d6
| 63347 ||  || — || March 16, 2001 || Socorro || LINEAR || — || align=right | 7.8 km || 
|-id=348 bgcolor=#fefefe
| 63348 ||  || — || March 16, 2001 || Socorro || LINEAR || V || align=right | 1.4 km || 
|-id=349 bgcolor=#E9E9E9
| 63349 ||  || — || March 17, 2001 || Socorro || LINEAR || — || align=right | 2.0 km || 
|-id=350 bgcolor=#d6d6d6
| 63350 ||  || — || March 18, 2001 || Socorro || LINEAR || — || align=right | 8.2 km || 
|-id=351 bgcolor=#fefefe
| 63351 ||  || — || March 19, 2001 || Kitt Peak || Spacewatch || — || align=right | 3.6 km || 
|-id=352 bgcolor=#E9E9E9
| 63352 ||  || — || March 26, 2001 || Socorro || LINEAR || — || align=right | 2.8 km || 
|-id=353 bgcolor=#fefefe
| 63353 ||  || — || March 21, 2001 || Socorro || LINEAR || — || align=right | 1.9 km || 
|-id=354 bgcolor=#d6d6d6
| 63354 ||  || — || March 22, 2001 || Kitt Peak || Spacewatch || — || align=right | 8.3 km || 
|-id=355 bgcolor=#d6d6d6
| 63355 ||  || — || March 23, 2001 || Anderson Mesa || LONEOS || — || align=right | 7.5 km || 
|-id=356 bgcolor=#d6d6d6
| 63356 ||  || — || March 24, 2001 || Anderson Mesa || LONEOS || EOS || align=right | 4.6 km || 
|-id=357 bgcolor=#E9E9E9
| 63357 ||  || — || March 27, 2001 || Anderson Mesa || LONEOS || EUN || align=right | 2.5 km || 
|-id=358 bgcolor=#d6d6d6
| 63358 ||  || — || March 27, 2001 || Anderson Mesa || LONEOS || EOS || align=right | 4.1 km || 
|-id=359 bgcolor=#E9E9E9
| 63359 ||  || — || March 29, 2001 || Anderson Mesa || LONEOS || — || align=right | 2.2 km || 
|-id=360 bgcolor=#E9E9E9
| 63360 ||  || — || March 18, 2001 || Socorro || LINEAR || — || align=right | 2.9 km || 
|-id=361 bgcolor=#fefefe
| 63361 ||  || — || March 24, 2001 || Kitt Peak || M. W. Buie || — || align=right | 2.3 km || 
|-id=362 bgcolor=#d6d6d6
| 63362 ||  || — || March 16, 2001 || Socorro || LINEAR || — || align=right | 4.9 km || 
|-id=363 bgcolor=#fefefe
| 63363 ||  || — || March 25, 2001 || Kitt Peak || M. W. Buie || V || align=right | 1.1 km || 
|-id=364 bgcolor=#fefefe
| 63364 ||  || — || April 17, 2001 || Socorro || LINEAR || — || align=right | 2.0 km || 
|-id=365 bgcolor=#fefefe
| 63365 ||  || — || April 17, 2001 || Socorro || LINEAR || NYS || align=right | 1.7 km || 
|-id=366 bgcolor=#fefefe
| 63366 ||  || — || April 17, 2001 || Desert Beaver || W. K. Y. Yeung || V || align=right | 1.6 km || 
|-id=367 bgcolor=#E9E9E9
| 63367 ||  || — || April 18, 2001 || Kitt Peak || Spacewatch || — || align=right | 1.9 km || 
|-id=368 bgcolor=#d6d6d6
| 63368 ||  || — || April 17, 2001 || Desert Beaver || W. K. Y. Yeung || EOS || align=right | 5.1 km || 
|-id=369 bgcolor=#E9E9E9
| 63369 ||  || — || April 17, 2001 || Desert Beaver || W. K. Y. Yeung || — || align=right | 3.4 km || 
|-id=370 bgcolor=#fefefe
| 63370 ||  || — || April 16, 2001 || Socorro || LINEAR || NYS || align=right | 1.9 km || 
|-id=371 bgcolor=#E9E9E9
| 63371 ||  || — || April 23, 2001 || Socorro || LINEAR || — || align=right | 5.0 km || 
|-id=372 bgcolor=#d6d6d6
| 63372 ||  || — || April 27, 2001 || Socorro || LINEAR || — || align=right | 5.7 km || 
|-id=373 bgcolor=#d6d6d6
| 63373 ||  || — || April 29, 2001 || Socorro || LINEAR || — || align=right | 12 km || 
|-id=374 bgcolor=#fefefe
| 63374 ||  || — || April 29, 2001 || Socorro || LINEAR || — || align=right | 1.9 km || 
|-id=375 bgcolor=#E9E9E9
| 63375 ||  || — || April 29, 2001 || Črni Vrh || Črni Vrh || — || align=right | 3.3 km || 
|-id=376 bgcolor=#fefefe
| 63376 ||  || — || April 29, 2001 || Črni Vrh || Črni Vrh || — || align=right | 1.9 km || 
|-id=377 bgcolor=#d6d6d6
| 63377 ||  || — || April 27, 2001 || Socorro || LINEAR || — || align=right | 6.6 km || 
|-id=378 bgcolor=#d6d6d6
| 63378 ||  || — || April 16, 2001 || Anderson Mesa || LONEOS || EOS || align=right | 4.4 km || 
|-id=379 bgcolor=#E9E9E9
| 63379 ||  || — || April 17, 2001 || Anderson Mesa || LONEOS || — || align=right | 4.6 km || 
|-id=380 bgcolor=#fefefe
| 63380 ||  || — || April 23, 2001 || Socorro || LINEAR || — || align=right | 1.9 km || 
|-id=381 bgcolor=#fefefe
| 63381 ||  || — || April 23, 2001 || Socorro || LINEAR || — || align=right | 2.1 km || 
|-id=382 bgcolor=#fefefe
| 63382 ||  || — || April 24, 2001 || Socorro || LINEAR || — || align=right | 1.9 km || 
|-id=383 bgcolor=#fefefe
| 63383 ||  || — || April 24, 2001 || Socorro || LINEAR || — || align=right | 1.9 km || 
|-id=384 bgcolor=#E9E9E9
| 63384 ||  || — || April 25, 2001 || Anderson Mesa || LONEOS || — || align=right | 2.6 km || 
|-id=385 bgcolor=#E9E9E9
| 63385 ||  || — || April 24, 2001 || Socorro || LINEAR || — || align=right | 2.3 km || 
|-id=386 bgcolor=#E9E9E9
| 63386 ||  || — || April 25, 2001 || Anderson Mesa || LONEOS || HNS || align=right | 2.6 km || 
|-id=387 bgcolor=#fefefe
| 63387 Brazos Bend ||  ||  || April 29, 2001 || Needville || Needville Obs. || ERI || align=right | 5.7 km || 
|-id=388 bgcolor=#E9E9E9
| 63388 ||  || — || April 21, 2001 || Socorro || LINEAR || — || align=right | 2.8 km || 
|-id=389 bgcolor=#E9E9E9
| 63389 Noshiro ||  ||  || May 12, 2001 || Bisei SG Center || BATTeRS || — || align=right | 5.9 km || 
|-id=390 bgcolor=#d6d6d6
| 63390 ||  || — || May 14, 2001 || Haleakala || NEAT || — || align=right | 6.1 km || 
|-id=391 bgcolor=#d6d6d6
| 63391 ||  || — || May 14, 2001 || Kitt Peak || Spacewatch || — || align=right | 4.2 km || 
|-id=392 bgcolor=#d6d6d6
| 63392 ||  || — || May 15, 2001 || Anderson Mesa || LONEOS || — || align=right | 6.7 km || 
|-id=393 bgcolor=#fefefe
| 63393 ||  || — || May 15, 2001 || Anderson Mesa || LONEOS || — || align=right | 1.8 km || 
|-id=394 bgcolor=#d6d6d6
| 63394 ||  || — || May 15, 2001 || Anderson Mesa || LONEOS || KOR || align=right | 3.5 km || 
|-id=395 bgcolor=#E9E9E9
| 63395 ||  || — || May 15, 2001 || Haleakala || NEAT || — || align=right | 4.7 km || 
|-id=396 bgcolor=#fefefe
| 63396 || 2001 KX || — || May 17, 2001 || Socorro || LINEAR || ERI || align=right | 4.0 km || 
|-id=397 bgcolor=#E9E9E9
| 63397 ||  || — || May 17, 2001 || Haleakala || NEAT || — || align=right | 2.4 km || 
|-id=398 bgcolor=#E9E9E9
| 63398 ||  || — || May 18, 2001 || Socorro || LINEAR || — || align=right | 4.6 km || 
|-id=399 bgcolor=#fefefe
| 63399 ||  || — || May 18, 2001 || Socorro || LINEAR || — || align=right | 2.5 km || 
|-id=400 bgcolor=#d6d6d6
| 63400 ||  || — || May 18, 2001 || Socorro || LINEAR || — || align=right | 5.4 km || 
|}

63401–63500 

|-bgcolor=#fefefe
| 63401 ||  || — || May 18, 2001 || Socorro || LINEAR || V || align=right | 1.9 km || 
|-id=402 bgcolor=#fefefe
| 63402 ||  || — || May 17, 2001 || Socorro || LINEAR || V || align=right | 1.7 km || 
|-id=403 bgcolor=#E9E9E9
| 63403 ||  || — || May 21, 2001 || Socorro || LINEAR || — || align=right | 5.0 km || 
|-id=404 bgcolor=#E9E9E9
| 63404 ||  || — || May 22, 2001 || Socorro || LINEAR || — || align=right | 4.2 km || 
|-id=405 bgcolor=#E9E9E9
| 63405 ||  || — || May 18, 2001 || Socorro || LINEAR || — || align=right | 1.9 km || 
|-id=406 bgcolor=#E9E9E9
| 63406 ||  || — || May 18, 2001 || Socorro || LINEAR || — || align=right | 2.4 km || 
|-id=407 bgcolor=#E9E9E9
| 63407 ||  || — || May 18, 2001 || Socorro || LINEAR || — || align=right | 2.8 km || 
|-id=408 bgcolor=#E9E9E9
| 63408 ||  || — || May 22, 2001 || Socorro || LINEAR || — || align=right | 2.5 km || 
|-id=409 bgcolor=#fefefe
| 63409 ||  || — || May 22, 2001 || Socorro || LINEAR || — || align=right | 2.3 km || 
|-id=410 bgcolor=#d6d6d6
| 63410 ||  || — || May 22, 2001 || Socorro || LINEAR || AEG || align=right | 8.5 km || 
|-id=411 bgcolor=#E9E9E9
| 63411 ||  || — || May 24, 2001 || Socorro || LINEAR || ADE || align=right | 7.4 km || 
|-id=412 bgcolor=#fefefe
| 63412 ||  || — || May 22, 2001 || Socorro || LINEAR || — || align=right | 5.0 km || 
|-id=413 bgcolor=#E9E9E9
| 63413 ||  || — || May 24, 2001 || Socorro || LINEAR || — || align=right | 5.3 km || 
|-id=414 bgcolor=#fefefe
| 63414 ||  || — || May 22, 2001 || Socorro || LINEAR || — || align=right | 2.6 km || 
|-id=415 bgcolor=#E9E9E9
| 63415 ||  || — || May 22, 2001 || Socorro || LINEAR || — || align=right | 2.7 km || 
|-id=416 bgcolor=#E9E9E9
| 63416 ||  || — || May 23, 2001 || Socorro || LINEAR || — || align=right | 2.0 km || 
|-id=417 bgcolor=#E9E9E9
| 63417 ||  || — || May 26, 2001 || Socorro || LINEAR || — || align=right | 3.9 km || 
|-id=418 bgcolor=#E9E9E9
| 63418 ||  || — || May 18, 2001 || Anderson Mesa || LONEOS || EUN || align=right | 3.3 km || 
|-id=419 bgcolor=#E9E9E9
| 63419 ||  || — || May 21, 2001 || Goodricke-Pigott || R. A. Tucker || EUN || align=right | 1.8 km || 
|-id=420 bgcolor=#fefefe
| 63420 ||  || — || May 22, 2001 || Anderson Mesa || LONEOS || PHO || align=right | 3.0 km || 
|-id=421 bgcolor=#E9E9E9
| 63421 ||  || — || May 26, 2001 || Palomar || NEAT || GEF || align=right | 2.4 km || 
|-id=422 bgcolor=#E9E9E9
| 63422 ||  || — || May 23, 2001 || Anderson Mesa || LONEOS || MAR || align=right | 3.2 km || 
|-id=423 bgcolor=#E9E9E9
| 63423 ||  || — || May 24, 2001 || Socorro || LINEAR || — || align=right | 4.5 km || 
|-id=424 bgcolor=#E9E9E9
| 63424 ||  || — || May 25, 2001 || Socorro || LINEAR || — || align=right | 1.8 km || 
|-id=425 bgcolor=#fefefe
| 63425 ||  || — || June 13, 2001 || Anderson Mesa || LONEOS || — || align=right | 2.3 km || 
|-id=426 bgcolor=#E9E9E9
| 63426 ||  || — || June 15, 2001 || Socorro || LINEAR || MAR || align=right | 3.2 km || 
|-id=427 bgcolor=#fefefe
| 63427 || 2001 MB || — || June 16, 2001 || Desert Beaver || W. K. Y. Yeung || NYS || align=right | 1.9 km || 
|-id=428 bgcolor=#E9E9E9
| 63428 ||  || — || June 18, 2001 || Reedy Creek || J. Broughton || — || align=right | 6.3 km || 
|-id=429 bgcolor=#fefefe
| 63429 ||  || — || June 21, 2001 || Calar Alto || Calar Alto Obs. || FLO || align=right | 2.0 km || 
|-id=430 bgcolor=#fefefe
| 63430 ||  || — || June 22, 2001 || Palomar || NEAT || FLO || align=right | 1.9 km || 
|-id=431 bgcolor=#E9E9E9
| 63431 ||  || — || June 28, 2001 || Anderson Mesa || LONEOS || — || align=right | 3.0 km || 
|-id=432 bgcolor=#fefefe
| 63432 ||  || — || June 28, 2001 || Anderson Mesa || LONEOS || MAS || align=right | 2.0 km || 
|-id=433 bgcolor=#E9E9E9
| 63433 ||  || — || June 28, 2001 || Anderson Mesa || LONEOS || — || align=right | 5.3 km || 
|-id=434 bgcolor=#fefefe
| 63434 ||  || — || June 26, 2001 || Palomar || NEAT || V || align=right | 2.4 km || 
|-id=435 bgcolor=#fefefe
| 63435 ||  || — || June 28, 2001 || Palomar || NEAT || — || align=right | 2.9 km || 
|-id=436 bgcolor=#E9E9E9
| 63436 ||  || — || June 27, 2001 || Haleakala || NEAT || — || align=right | 4.0 km || 
|-id=437 bgcolor=#E9E9E9
| 63437 ||  || — || June 27, 2001 || Haleakala || NEAT || ADE || align=right | 8.6 km || 
|-id=438 bgcolor=#E9E9E9
| 63438 ||  || — || June 27, 2001 || Anderson Mesa || LONEOS || — || align=right | 2.8 km || 
|-id=439 bgcolor=#fefefe
| 63439 ||  || — || June 27, 2001 || Anderson Mesa || LONEOS || — || align=right | 4.1 km || 
|-id=440 bgcolor=#fefefe
| 63440 Rożek ||  ||  || June 30, 2001 || Anderson Mesa || LONEOS || H || align=right | 2.0 km || 
|-id=441 bgcolor=#fefefe
| 63441 ||  || — || July 12, 2001 || Palomar || NEAT || — || align=right | 2.1 km || 
|-id=442 bgcolor=#E9E9E9
| 63442 ||  || — || July 14, 2001 || Socorro || LINEAR || — || align=right | 10 km || 
|-id=443 bgcolor=#E9E9E9
| 63443 ||  || — || July 13, 2001 || Palomar || NEAT || HNS || align=right | 2.1 km || 
|-id=444 bgcolor=#d6d6d6
| 63444 ||  || — || July 14, 2001 || Palomar || NEAT || — || align=right | 6.4 km || 
|-id=445 bgcolor=#E9E9E9
| 63445 ||  || — || July 13, 2001 || Palomar || NEAT || — || align=right | 4.0 km || 
|-id=446 bgcolor=#fefefe
| 63446 ||  || — || July 15, 2001 || Ondřejov || L. Kotková || FLO || align=right | 1.3 km || 
|-id=447 bgcolor=#fefefe
| 63447 ||  || — || July 14, 2001 || Haleakala || NEAT || ERI || align=right | 4.8 km || 
|-id=448 bgcolor=#E9E9E9
| 63448 ||  || — || July 14, 2001 || Palomar || NEAT || ADE || align=right | 3.7 km || 
|-id=449 bgcolor=#fefefe
| 63449 ||  || — || July 14, 2001 || Haleakala || NEAT || — || align=right | 2.9 km || 
|-id=450 bgcolor=#E9E9E9
| 63450 ||  || — || July 14, 2001 || Palomar || NEAT || — || align=right | 8.0 km || 
|-id=451 bgcolor=#E9E9E9
| 63451 || 2001 OB || — || July 16, 2001 || Reedy Creek || J. Broughton || — || align=right | 3.1 km || 
|-id=452 bgcolor=#fefefe
| 63452 ||  || — || July 17, 2001 || Anderson Mesa || LONEOS || H || align=right | 1.2 km || 
|-id=453 bgcolor=#fefefe
| 63453 ||  || — || July 19, 2001 || Palomar || NEAT || — || align=right | 1.5 km || 
|-id=454 bgcolor=#d6d6d6
| 63454 ||  || — || July 17, 2001 || Anderson Mesa || LONEOS || — || align=right | 11 km || 
|-id=455 bgcolor=#d6d6d6
| 63455 ||  || — || July 17, 2001 || Anderson Mesa || LONEOS || — || align=right | 5.6 km || 
|-id=456 bgcolor=#d6d6d6
| 63456 ||  || — || July 17, 2001 || Anderson Mesa || LONEOS || — || align=right | 4.8 km || 
|-id=457 bgcolor=#E9E9E9
| 63457 ||  || — || July 17, 2001 || Anderson Mesa || LONEOS || — || align=right | 2.9 km || 
|-id=458 bgcolor=#d6d6d6
| 63458 ||  || — || July 17, 2001 || Anderson Mesa || LONEOS || — || align=right | 6.8 km || 
|-id=459 bgcolor=#d6d6d6
| 63459 ||  || — || July 17, 2001 || Anderson Mesa || LONEOS || — || align=right | 7.1 km || 
|-id=460 bgcolor=#fefefe
| 63460 ||  || — || July 17, 2001 || Anderson Mesa || LONEOS || V || align=right | 1.7 km || 
|-id=461 bgcolor=#d6d6d6
| 63461 ||  || — || July 17, 2001 || Anderson Mesa || LONEOS || EOS || align=right | 4.6 km || 
|-id=462 bgcolor=#d6d6d6
| 63462 ||  || — || July 20, 2001 || Anderson Mesa || LONEOS || — || align=right | 8.2 km || 
|-id=463 bgcolor=#fefefe
| 63463 ||  || — || July 20, 2001 || San Marcello || M. Tombelli, L. Tesi || V || align=right | 1.4 km || 
|-id=464 bgcolor=#fefefe
| 63464 ||  || — || July 21, 2001 || Palomar || NEAT || — || align=right | 3.8 km || 
|-id=465 bgcolor=#d6d6d6
| 63465 ||  || — || July 17, 2001 || Haleakala || NEAT || EOS || align=right | 4.4 km || 
|-id=466 bgcolor=#E9E9E9
| 63466 ||  || — || July 21, 2001 || Anderson Mesa || LONEOS || WIT || align=right | 2.7 km || 
|-id=467 bgcolor=#E9E9E9
| 63467 ||  || — || July 21, 2001 || Anderson Mesa || LONEOS || — || align=right | 3.3 km || 
|-id=468 bgcolor=#fefefe
| 63468 ||  || — || July 21, 2001 || Anderson Mesa || LONEOS || MAS || align=right | 2.2 km || 
|-id=469 bgcolor=#E9E9E9
| 63469 ||  || — || July 17, 2001 || Palomar || NEAT || — || align=right | 4.7 km || 
|-id=470 bgcolor=#d6d6d6
| 63470 ||  || — || July 22, 2001 || Palomar || NEAT || — || align=right | 5.0 km || 
|-id=471 bgcolor=#E9E9E9
| 63471 ||  || — || July 16, 2001 || Haleakala || NEAT || — || align=right | 6.8 km || 
|-id=472 bgcolor=#E9E9E9
| 63472 ||  || — || July 19, 2001 || Haleakala || NEAT || — || align=right | 2.5 km || 
|-id=473 bgcolor=#d6d6d6
| 63473 ||  || — || July 19, 2001 || Haleakala || NEAT || — || align=right | 5.8 km || 
|-id=474 bgcolor=#fefefe
| 63474 ||  || — || July 18, 2001 || Palomar || NEAT || V || align=right | 1.1 km || 
|-id=475 bgcolor=#d6d6d6
| 63475 ||  || — || July 23, 2001 || Reedy Creek || J. Broughton || EOS || align=right | 6.7 km || 
|-id=476 bgcolor=#E9E9E9
| 63476 ||  || — || July 20, 2001 || Palomar || NEAT || — || align=right | 5.1 km || 
|-id=477 bgcolor=#d6d6d6
| 63477 ||  || — || July 20, 2001 || Palomar || NEAT || EOS || align=right | 4.6 km || 
|-id=478 bgcolor=#fefefe
| 63478 ||  || — || July 20, 2001 || Palomar || NEAT || ERI || align=right | 3.6 km || 
|-id=479 bgcolor=#E9E9E9
| 63479 ||  || — || July 20, 2001 || Palomar || NEAT || — || align=right | 4.2 km || 
|-id=480 bgcolor=#fefefe
| 63480 ||  || — || July 22, 2001 || Palomar || NEAT || V || align=right | 1.5 km || 
|-id=481 bgcolor=#E9E9E9
| 63481 ||  || — || July 22, 2001 || Palomar || NEAT || — || align=right | 3.1 km || 
|-id=482 bgcolor=#E9E9E9
| 63482 ||  || — || July 22, 2001 || Palomar || NEAT || — || align=right | 4.1 km || 
|-id=483 bgcolor=#fefefe
| 63483 ||  || — || July 22, 2001 || Palomar || NEAT || — || align=right | 2.8 km || 
|-id=484 bgcolor=#d6d6d6
| 63484 ||  || — || July 16, 2001 || Haleakala || NEAT || — || align=right | 6.7 km || 
|-id=485 bgcolor=#d6d6d6
| 63485 ||  || — || July 17, 2001 || Anderson Mesa || LONEOS || — || align=right | 4.7 km || 
|-id=486 bgcolor=#E9E9E9
| 63486 ||  || — || July 22, 2001 || Palomar || NEAT || — || align=right | 5.2 km || 
|-id=487 bgcolor=#d6d6d6
| 63487 ||  || — || July 22, 2001 || Palomar || NEAT || — || align=right | 7.1 km || 
|-id=488 bgcolor=#d6d6d6
| 63488 ||  || — || July 16, 2001 || Anderson Mesa || LONEOS || 3:2 || align=right | 14 km || 
|-id=489 bgcolor=#d6d6d6
| 63489 ||  || — || July 16, 2001 || Anderson Mesa || LONEOS || — || align=right | 11 km || 
|-id=490 bgcolor=#E9E9E9
| 63490 ||  || — || July 21, 2001 || Haleakala || NEAT || — || align=right | 2.6 km || 
|-id=491 bgcolor=#d6d6d6
| 63491 ||  || — || July 21, 2001 || Haleakala || NEAT || SHU3:2 || align=right | 11 km || 
|-id=492 bgcolor=#d6d6d6
| 63492 ||  || — || July 23, 2001 || Haleakala || NEAT || EOS || align=right | 4.8 km || 
|-id=493 bgcolor=#fefefe
| 63493 ||  || — || July 20, 2001 || Anderson Mesa || LONEOS || NYS || align=right | 2.4 km || 
|-id=494 bgcolor=#E9E9E9
| 63494 ||  || — || July 23, 2001 || Haleakala || NEAT || PAD || align=right | 6.8 km || 
|-id=495 bgcolor=#d6d6d6
| 63495 ||  || — || July 24, 2001 || Haleakala || NEAT || EOS || align=right | 5.3 km || 
|-id=496 bgcolor=#fefefe
| 63496 ||  || — || July 24, 2001 || Haleakala || NEAT || — || align=right | 2.1 km || 
|-id=497 bgcolor=#d6d6d6
| 63497 ||  || — || July 22, 2001 || Palomar || NEAT || — || align=right | 6.4 km || 
|-id=498 bgcolor=#d6d6d6
| 63498 ||  || — || July 28, 2001 || Reedy Creek || J. Broughton || URS || align=right | 8.5 km || 
|-id=499 bgcolor=#E9E9E9
| 63499 ||  || — || July 19, 2001 || Anderson Mesa || LONEOS || — || align=right | 2.4 km || 
|-id=500 bgcolor=#E9E9E9
| 63500 ||  || — || July 19, 2001 || Anderson Mesa || LONEOS || — || align=right | 2.8 km || 
|}

63501–63600 

|-bgcolor=#fefefe
| 63501 ||  || — || July 19, 2001 || Anderson Mesa || LONEOS || NYS || align=right | 2.2 km || 
|-id=502 bgcolor=#fefefe
| 63502 ||  || — || July 21, 2001 || Anderson Mesa || LONEOS || NYS || align=right | 1.4 km || 
|-id=503 bgcolor=#fefefe
| 63503 ||  || — || July 21, 2001 || Anderson Mesa || LONEOS || — || align=right | 1.8 km || 
|-id=504 bgcolor=#d6d6d6
| 63504 ||  || — || July 26, 2001 || Palomar || NEAT || EOS || align=right | 6.2 km || 
|-id=505 bgcolor=#E9E9E9
| 63505 ||  || — || July 27, 2001 || Palomar || NEAT || — || align=right | 2.3 km || 
|-id=506 bgcolor=#E9E9E9
| 63506 ||  || — || July 29, 2001 || Socorro || LINEAR || — || align=right | 2.9 km || 
|-id=507 bgcolor=#fefefe
| 63507 ||  || — || July 30, 2001 || Socorro || LINEAR || — || align=right | 2.2 km || 
|-id=508 bgcolor=#E9E9E9
| 63508 ||  || — || July 26, 2001 || Haleakala || NEAT || — || align=right | 6.7 km || 
|-id=509 bgcolor=#E9E9E9
| 63509 ||  || — || July 27, 2001 || Palomar || NEAT || — || align=right | 3.2 km || 
|-id=510 bgcolor=#E9E9E9
| 63510 ||  || — || July 21, 2001 || Haleakala || NEAT || — || align=right | 2.8 km || 
|-id=511 bgcolor=#fefefe
| 63511 ||  || — || July 22, 2001 || Palomar || NEAT || — || align=right | 1.9 km || 
|-id=512 bgcolor=#fefefe
| 63512 ||  || — || July 29, 2001 || Bergisch Gladbach || W. Bickel || V || align=right | 2.1 km || 
|-id=513 bgcolor=#fefefe
| 63513 ||  || — || July 25, 2001 || Palomar || NEAT || H || align=right | 1.5 km || 
|-id=514 bgcolor=#d6d6d6
| 63514 ||  || — || July 27, 2001 || Anderson Mesa || LONEOS || — || align=right | 4.3 km || 
|-id=515 bgcolor=#E9E9E9
| 63515 ||  || — || July 27, 2001 || Anderson Mesa || LONEOS || — || align=right | 2.4 km || 
|-id=516 bgcolor=#d6d6d6
| 63516 ||  || — || July 29, 2001 || Palomar || NEAT || — || align=right | 11 km || 
|-id=517 bgcolor=#d6d6d6
| 63517 ||  || — || July 30, 2001 || Socorro || LINEAR || URS || align=right | 9.6 km || 
|-id=518 bgcolor=#d6d6d6
| 63518 ||  || — || July 29, 2001 || Anderson Mesa || LONEOS || — || align=right | 4.7 km || 
|-id=519 bgcolor=#fefefe
| 63519 ||  || — || July 29, 2001 || Socorro || LINEAR || FLO || align=right | 2.9 km || 
|-id=520 bgcolor=#d6d6d6
| 63520 || 2001 PF || — || August 3, 2001 || Palomar || NEAT || — || align=right | 8.5 km || 
|-id=521 bgcolor=#E9E9E9
| 63521 || 2001 PL || — || August 5, 2001 || Haleakala || NEAT || HNS || align=right | 3.4 km || 
|-id=522 bgcolor=#d6d6d6
| 63522 || 2001 PP || — || August 6, 2001 || Palomar || NEAT || — || align=right | 7.6 km || 
|-id=523 bgcolor=#E9E9E9
| 63523 ||  || — || August 9, 2001 || Reedy Creek || J. Broughton || — || align=right | 2.0 km || 
|-id=524 bgcolor=#E9E9E9
| 63524 ||  || — || August 3, 2001 || Haleakala || NEAT || — || align=right | 2.8 km || 
|-id=525 bgcolor=#d6d6d6
| 63525 ||  || — || August 3, 2001 || Haleakala || NEAT || 628 || align=right | 4.5 km || 
|-id=526 bgcolor=#E9E9E9
| 63526 ||  || — || August 7, 2001 || Haleakala || NEAT || GEF || align=right | 3.2 km || 
|-id=527 bgcolor=#fefefe
| 63527 ||  || — || August 11, 2001 || Haleakala || NEAT || H || align=right | 1.2 km || 
|-id=528 bgcolor=#d6d6d6
| 63528 Kocherhans ||  ||  || August 13, 2001 || Badlands || R. Dyvig || — || align=right | 5.0 km || 
|-id=529 bgcolor=#d6d6d6
| 63529 ||  || — || August 10, 2001 || Palomar || NEAT || YAK || align=right | 7.9 km || 
|-id=530 bgcolor=#d6d6d6
| 63530 ||  || — || August 10, 2001 || Palomar || NEAT || FIR || align=right | 7.8 km || 
|-id=531 bgcolor=#d6d6d6
| 63531 ||  || — || August 10, 2001 || Haleakala || NEAT || KOR || align=right | 3.7 km || 
|-id=532 bgcolor=#d6d6d6
| 63532 ||  || — || August 10, 2001 || Haleakala || NEAT || — || align=right | 8.3 km || 
|-id=533 bgcolor=#E9E9E9
| 63533 ||  || — || August 10, 2001 || Haleakala || NEAT || — || align=right | 2.3 km || 
|-id=534 bgcolor=#d6d6d6
| 63534 ||  || — || August 11, 2001 || Haleakala || NEAT || THM || align=right | 6.1 km || 
|-id=535 bgcolor=#fefefe
| 63535 ||  || — || August 11, 2001 || Haleakala || NEAT || FLO || align=right | 1.4 km || 
|-id=536 bgcolor=#d6d6d6
| 63536 ||  || — || August 11, 2001 || Haleakala || NEAT || — || align=right | 6.1 km || 
|-id=537 bgcolor=#d6d6d6
| 63537 ||  || — || August 10, 2001 || Palomar || NEAT || EOS || align=right | 6.5 km || 
|-id=538 bgcolor=#d6d6d6
| 63538 ||  || — || August 11, 2001 || Palomar || NEAT || — || align=right | 6.3 km || 
|-id=539 bgcolor=#E9E9E9
| 63539 ||  || — || August 11, 2001 || Palomar || NEAT || — || align=right | 3.1 km || 
|-id=540 bgcolor=#fefefe
| 63540 ||  || — || August 11, 2001 || Palomar || NEAT || — || align=right | 3.4 km || 
|-id=541 bgcolor=#E9E9E9
| 63541 ||  || — || August 11, 2001 || Palomar || NEAT || — || align=right | 2.7 km || 
|-id=542 bgcolor=#d6d6d6
| 63542 ||  || — || August 11, 2001 || Haleakala || NEAT || HYG || align=right | 8.2 km || 
|-id=543 bgcolor=#E9E9E9
| 63543 ||  || — || August 11, 2001 || Haleakala || NEAT || — || align=right | 3.6 km || 
|-id=544 bgcolor=#d6d6d6
| 63544 ||  || — || August 13, 2001 || Bergisch Gladbach || W. Bickel || — || align=right | 7.7 km || 
|-id=545 bgcolor=#fefefe
| 63545 ||  || — || August 3, 2001 || Palomar || NEAT || PHO || align=right | 2.1 km || 
|-id=546 bgcolor=#d6d6d6
| 63546 ||  || — || August 14, 2001 || Haleakala || NEAT || — || align=right | 4.3 km || 
|-id=547 bgcolor=#d6d6d6
| 63547 ||  || — || August 14, 2001 || Haleakala || NEAT || — || align=right | 9.2 km || 
|-id=548 bgcolor=#d6d6d6
| 63548 ||  || — || August 14, 2001 || Haleakala || NEAT || — || align=right | 6.2 km || 
|-id=549 bgcolor=#E9E9E9
| 63549 ||  || — || August 13, 2001 || Haleakala || NEAT || — || align=right | 2.9 km || 
|-id=550 bgcolor=#E9E9E9
| 63550 ||  || — || August 1, 2001 || Palomar || NEAT || — || align=right | 1.9 km || 
|-id=551 bgcolor=#fefefe
| 63551 ||  || — || August 16, 2001 || Socorro || LINEAR || — || align=right | 1.4 km || 
|-id=552 bgcolor=#E9E9E9
| 63552 ||  || — || August 16, 2001 || Socorro || LINEAR || — || align=right | 4.7 km || 
|-id=553 bgcolor=#fefefe
| 63553 ||  || — || August 16, 2001 || Socorro || LINEAR || — || align=right | 1.4 km || 
|-id=554 bgcolor=#d6d6d6
| 63554 ||  || — || August 16, 2001 || Socorro || LINEAR || 7:4 || align=right | 8.0 km || 
|-id=555 bgcolor=#d6d6d6
| 63555 ||  || — || August 16, 2001 || Socorro || LINEAR || — || align=right | 5.7 km || 
|-id=556 bgcolor=#fefefe
| 63556 ||  || — || August 16, 2001 || Socorro || LINEAR || FLO || align=right | 1.4 km || 
|-id=557 bgcolor=#fefefe
| 63557 ||  || — || August 16, 2001 || Socorro || LINEAR || — || align=right | 1.2 km || 
|-id=558 bgcolor=#fefefe
| 63558 ||  || — || August 16, 2001 || Socorro || LINEAR || — || align=right | 1.3 km || 
|-id=559 bgcolor=#fefefe
| 63559 ||  || — || August 16, 2001 || Socorro || LINEAR || — || align=right | 4.4 km || 
|-id=560 bgcolor=#fefefe
| 63560 ||  || — || August 16, 2001 || Socorro || LINEAR || — || align=right data-sort-value="0.98" | 980 m || 
|-id=561 bgcolor=#fefefe
| 63561 ||  || — || August 16, 2001 || Socorro || LINEAR || NYS || align=right | 1.6 km || 
|-id=562 bgcolor=#E9E9E9
| 63562 ||  || — || August 16, 2001 || Socorro || LINEAR || — || align=right | 2.2 km || 
|-id=563 bgcolor=#fefefe
| 63563 ||  || — || August 16, 2001 || Socorro || LINEAR || NYS || align=right | 1.9 km || 
|-id=564 bgcolor=#d6d6d6
| 63564 ||  || — || August 16, 2001 || Socorro || LINEAR || — || align=right | 5.5 km || 
|-id=565 bgcolor=#d6d6d6
| 63565 ||  || — || August 16, 2001 || Socorro || LINEAR || — || align=right | 5.5 km || 
|-id=566 bgcolor=#d6d6d6
| 63566 ||  || — || August 16, 2001 || Socorro || LINEAR || — || align=right | 4.6 km || 
|-id=567 bgcolor=#fefefe
| 63567 ||  || — || August 16, 2001 || Socorro || LINEAR || — || align=right | 2.0 km || 
|-id=568 bgcolor=#d6d6d6
| 63568 ||  || — || August 16, 2001 || Socorro || LINEAR || THM || align=right | 8.9 km || 
|-id=569 bgcolor=#E9E9E9
| 63569 ||  || — || August 16, 2001 || Socorro || LINEAR || — || align=right | 3.6 km || 
|-id=570 bgcolor=#E9E9E9
| 63570 ||  || — || August 16, 2001 || Socorro || LINEAR || — || align=right | 4.7 km || 
|-id=571 bgcolor=#fefefe
| 63571 ||  || — || August 16, 2001 || Socorro || LINEAR || NYS || align=right | 2.5 km || 
|-id=572 bgcolor=#fefefe
| 63572 ||  || — || August 16, 2001 || Socorro || LINEAR || — || align=right | 2.0 km || 
|-id=573 bgcolor=#E9E9E9
| 63573 ||  || — || August 16, 2001 || Socorro || LINEAR || fast || align=right | 3.8 km || 
|-id=574 bgcolor=#fefefe
| 63574 ||  || — || August 16, 2001 || Socorro || LINEAR || — || align=right | 2.1 km || 
|-id=575 bgcolor=#E9E9E9
| 63575 ||  || — || August 16, 2001 || Socorro || LINEAR || EUN || align=right | 3.4 km || 
|-id=576 bgcolor=#fefefe
| 63576 ||  || — || August 16, 2001 || Socorro || LINEAR || — || align=right | 2.1 km || 
|-id=577 bgcolor=#fefefe
| 63577 ||  || — || August 16, 2001 || Socorro || LINEAR || V || align=right | 1.9 km || 
|-id=578 bgcolor=#fefefe
| 63578 ||  || — || August 16, 2001 || Socorro || LINEAR || — || align=right | 6.7 km || 
|-id=579 bgcolor=#fefefe
| 63579 ||  || — || August 16, 2001 || Socorro || LINEAR || — || align=right | 3.7 km || 
|-id=580 bgcolor=#fefefe
| 63580 ||  || — || August 16, 2001 || Socorro || LINEAR || NYS || align=right | 2.5 km || 
|-id=581 bgcolor=#fefefe
| 63581 ||  || — || August 16, 2001 || Socorro || LINEAR || NYS || align=right | 1.7 km || 
|-id=582 bgcolor=#d6d6d6
| 63582 ||  || — || August 16, 2001 || Socorro || LINEAR || — || align=right | 6.7 km || 
|-id=583 bgcolor=#FA8072
| 63583 ||  || — || August 16, 2001 || Socorro || LINEAR || — || align=right | 2.1 km || 
|-id=584 bgcolor=#d6d6d6
| 63584 ||  || — || August 19, 2001 || Ondřejov || P. Kušnirák, P. Pravec || VER || align=right | 6.2 km || 
|-id=585 bgcolor=#d6d6d6
| 63585 ||  || — || August 16, 2001 || Socorro || LINEAR || EOS || align=right | 3.9 km || 
|-id=586 bgcolor=#d6d6d6
| 63586 ||  || — || August 16, 2001 || Socorro || LINEAR || THM || align=right | 5.4 km || 
|-id=587 bgcolor=#d6d6d6
| 63587 ||  || — || August 16, 2001 || Socorro || LINEAR || — || align=right | 5.7 km || 
|-id=588 bgcolor=#fefefe
| 63588 ||  || — || August 16, 2001 || Socorro || LINEAR || — || align=right | 1.1 km || 
|-id=589 bgcolor=#d6d6d6
| 63589 ||  || — || August 16, 2001 || Socorro || LINEAR || — || align=right | 4.7 km || 
|-id=590 bgcolor=#fefefe
| 63590 ||  || — || August 18, 2001 || Socorro || LINEAR || NYS || align=right | 1.3 km || 
|-id=591 bgcolor=#d6d6d6
| 63591 ||  || — || August 16, 2001 || Socorro || LINEAR || — || align=right | 8.4 km || 
|-id=592 bgcolor=#fefefe
| 63592 ||  || — || August 16, 2001 || Socorro || LINEAR || FLO || align=right | 2.5 km || 
|-id=593 bgcolor=#fefefe
| 63593 ||  || — || August 16, 2001 || Socorro || LINEAR || V || align=right | 1.6 km || 
|-id=594 bgcolor=#d6d6d6
| 63594 ||  || — || August 16, 2001 || Socorro || LINEAR || THM || align=right | 6.0 km || 
|-id=595 bgcolor=#fefefe
| 63595 ||  || — || August 16, 2001 || Socorro || LINEAR || V || align=right | 1.3 km || 
|-id=596 bgcolor=#E9E9E9
| 63596 ||  || — || August 16, 2001 || Socorro || LINEAR || DOR || align=right | 4.9 km || 
|-id=597 bgcolor=#E9E9E9
| 63597 ||  || — || August 16, 2001 || Socorro || LINEAR || — || align=right | 3.8 km || 
|-id=598 bgcolor=#E9E9E9
| 63598 ||  || — || August 17, 2001 || Socorro || LINEAR || — || align=right | 5.8 km || 
|-id=599 bgcolor=#E9E9E9
| 63599 ||  || — || August 17, 2001 || Socorro || LINEAR || — || align=right | 6.5 km || 
|-id=600 bgcolor=#d6d6d6
| 63600 ||  || — || August 17, 2001 || Socorro || LINEAR || EOS || align=right | 6.5 km || 
|}

63601–63700 

|-bgcolor=#fefefe
| 63601 ||  || — || August 17, 2001 || Socorro || LINEAR || V || align=right | 2.0 km || 
|-id=602 bgcolor=#E9E9E9
| 63602 ||  || — || August 18, 2001 || Socorro || LINEAR || EUN || align=right | 3.5 km || 
|-id=603 bgcolor=#E9E9E9
| 63603 ||  || — || August 18, 2001 || Socorro || LINEAR || — || align=right | 4.6 km || 
|-id=604 bgcolor=#E9E9E9
| 63604 ||  || — || August 16, 2001 || Kitt Peak || Spacewatch || EUN || align=right | 5.6 km || 
|-id=605 bgcolor=#fefefe
| 63605 Budperry ||  ||  || August 20, 2001 || Oakley || C. Wolfe || H || align=right | 1.8 km || 
|-id=606 bgcolor=#d6d6d6
| 63606 ||  || — || August 17, 2001 || Socorro || LINEAR || — || align=right | 6.0 km || 
|-id=607 bgcolor=#fefefe
| 63607 ||  || — || August 17, 2001 || Socorro || LINEAR || — || align=right | 2.1 km || 
|-id=608 bgcolor=#fefefe
| 63608 ||  || — || August 21, 2001 || Desert Eagle || W. K. Y. Yeung || NYS || align=right | 1.6 km || 
|-id=609 bgcolor=#d6d6d6
| 63609 Francoisecolas ||  ||  || August 20, 2001 || Pic du Midi || Pic du Midi Obs. || — || align=right | 5.1 km || 
|-id=610 bgcolor=#E9E9E9
| 63610 ||  || — || August 16, 2001 || Socorro || LINEAR || — || align=right | 3.5 km || 
|-id=611 bgcolor=#fefefe
| 63611 ||  || — || August 16, 2001 || Socorro || LINEAR || FLO || align=right | 2.1 km || 
|-id=612 bgcolor=#fefefe
| 63612 ||  || — || August 16, 2001 || Socorro || LINEAR || — || align=right | 2.3 km || 
|-id=613 bgcolor=#E9E9E9
| 63613 ||  || — || August 16, 2001 || Socorro || LINEAR || — || align=right | 4.6 km || 
|-id=614 bgcolor=#E9E9E9
| 63614 ||  || — || August 16, 2001 || Socorro || LINEAR || EUN || align=right | 3.9 km || 
|-id=615 bgcolor=#fefefe
| 63615 ||  || — || August 16, 2001 || Socorro || LINEAR || — || align=right | 3.0 km || 
|-id=616 bgcolor=#E9E9E9
| 63616 ||  || — || August 16, 2001 || Socorro || LINEAR || — || align=right | 5.4 km || 
|-id=617 bgcolor=#fefefe
| 63617 ||  || — || August 16, 2001 || Socorro || LINEAR || FLO || align=right | 1.9 km || 
|-id=618 bgcolor=#fefefe
| 63618 ||  || — || August 16, 2001 || Socorro || LINEAR || NYS || align=right | 2.0 km || 
|-id=619 bgcolor=#fefefe
| 63619 ||  || — || August 16, 2001 || Socorro || LINEAR || — || align=right | 2.8 km || 
|-id=620 bgcolor=#fefefe
| 63620 ||  || — || August 16, 2001 || Socorro || LINEAR || — || align=right | 4.7 km || 
|-id=621 bgcolor=#fefefe
| 63621 ||  || — || August 16, 2001 || Socorro || LINEAR || NYS || align=right | 2.2 km || 
|-id=622 bgcolor=#d6d6d6
| 63622 ||  || — || August 16, 2001 || Socorro || LINEAR || — || align=right | 8.2 km || 
|-id=623 bgcolor=#fefefe
| 63623 ||  || — || August 16, 2001 || Socorro || LINEAR || — || align=right | 4.8 km || 
|-id=624 bgcolor=#fefefe
| 63624 ||  || — || August 16, 2001 || Socorro || LINEAR || NYS || align=right | 1.9 km || 
|-id=625 bgcolor=#fefefe
| 63625 ||  || — || August 16, 2001 || Socorro || LINEAR || — || align=right | 2.5 km || 
|-id=626 bgcolor=#E9E9E9
| 63626 ||  || — || August 16, 2001 || Socorro || LINEAR || — || align=right | 5.2 km || 
|-id=627 bgcolor=#fefefe
| 63627 ||  || — || August 16, 2001 || Socorro || LINEAR || — || align=right | 2.2 km || 
|-id=628 bgcolor=#d6d6d6
| 63628 ||  || — || August 17, 2001 || Socorro || LINEAR || — || align=right | 7.4 km || 
|-id=629 bgcolor=#E9E9E9
| 63629 ||  || — || August 17, 2001 || Socorro || LINEAR || EUN || align=right | 4.9 km || 
|-id=630 bgcolor=#fefefe
| 63630 ||  || — || August 17, 2001 || Socorro || LINEAR || — || align=right | 3.2 km || 
|-id=631 bgcolor=#E9E9E9
| 63631 ||  || — || August 17, 2001 || Socorro || LINEAR || — || align=right | 4.7 km || 
|-id=632 bgcolor=#E9E9E9
| 63632 ||  || — || August 17, 2001 || Socorro || LINEAR || — || align=right | 5.1 km || 
|-id=633 bgcolor=#fefefe
| 63633 ||  || — || August 18, 2001 || Socorro || LINEAR || — || align=right | 2.7 km || 
|-id=634 bgcolor=#E9E9E9
| 63634 ||  || — || August 16, 2001 || Palomar || NEAT || HNS || align=right | 2.8 km || 
|-id=635 bgcolor=#E9E9E9
| 63635 ||  || — || August 22, 2001 || Kitt Peak || Spacewatch || MRX || align=right | 2.0 km || 
|-id=636 bgcolor=#fefefe
| 63636 ||  || — || August 20, 2001 || Palomar || NEAT || — || align=right | 2.0 km || 
|-id=637 bgcolor=#fefefe
| 63637 ||  || — || August 22, 2001 || Socorro || LINEAR || H || align=right | 2.0 km || 
|-id=638 bgcolor=#d6d6d6
| 63638 ||  || — || August 22, 2001 || Socorro || LINEAR || — || align=right | 7.1 km || 
|-id=639 bgcolor=#E9E9E9
| 63639 ||  || — || August 22, 2001 || Socorro || LINEAR || — || align=right | 6.6 km || 
|-id=640 bgcolor=#fefefe
| 63640 ||  || — || August 23, 2001 || Desert Eagle || W. K. Y. Yeung || — || align=right | 1.5 km || 
|-id=641 bgcolor=#d6d6d6
| 63641 ||  || — || August 17, 2001 || Socorro || LINEAR || EOS || align=right | 6.2 km || 
|-id=642 bgcolor=#fefefe
| 63642 ||  || — || August 17, 2001 || Socorro || LINEAR || — || align=right | 3.5 km || 
|-id=643 bgcolor=#E9E9E9
| 63643 ||  || — || August 22, 2001 || Socorro || LINEAR || — || align=right | 4.3 km || 
|-id=644 bgcolor=#fefefe
| 63644 ||  || — || August 22, 2001 || Socorro || LINEAR || H || align=right | 1.3 km || 
|-id=645 bgcolor=#fefefe
| 63645 ||  || — || August 18, 2001 || Socorro || LINEAR || — || align=right | 2.0 km || 
|-id=646 bgcolor=#E9E9E9
| 63646 ||  || — || August 18, 2001 || Socorro || LINEAR || — || align=right | 3.3 km || 
|-id=647 bgcolor=#d6d6d6
| 63647 ||  || — || August 20, 2001 || Socorro || LINEAR || — || align=right | 8.2 km || 
|-id=648 bgcolor=#fefefe
| 63648 ||  || — || August 22, 2001 || Socorro || LINEAR || — || align=right | 2.1 km || 
|-id=649 bgcolor=#fefefe
| 63649 ||  || — || August 23, 2001 || Socorro || LINEAR || V || align=right | 2.0 km || 
|-id=650 bgcolor=#d6d6d6
| 63650 ||  || — || August 23, 2001 || Anderson Mesa || LONEOS || — || align=right | 5.8 km || 
|-id=651 bgcolor=#E9E9E9
| 63651 ||  || — || August 18, 2001 || Anderson Mesa || LONEOS || — || align=right | 4.8 km || 
|-id=652 bgcolor=#E9E9E9
| 63652 ||  || — || August 23, 2001 || Desert Eagle || W. K. Y. Yeung || — || align=right | 4.5 km || 
|-id=653 bgcolor=#fefefe
| 63653 ||  || — || August 21, 2001 || Palomar || NEAT || — || align=right | 3.0 km || 
|-id=654 bgcolor=#d6d6d6
| 63654 ||  || — || August 25, 2001 || Socorro || LINEAR || — || align=right | 12 km || 
|-id=655 bgcolor=#E9E9E9
| 63655 ||  || — || August 26, 2001 || Ondřejov || P. Kušnirák, P. Pravec || — || align=right | 2.8 km || 
|-id=656 bgcolor=#fefefe
| 63656 ||  || — || August 17, 2001 || Socorro || LINEAR || — || align=right | 2.4 km || 
|-id=657 bgcolor=#fefefe
| 63657 ||  || — || August 17, 2001 || Socorro || LINEAR || — || align=right | 2.2 km || 
|-id=658 bgcolor=#d6d6d6
| 63658 ||  || — || August 17, 2001 || Socorro || LINEAR || — || align=right | 7.3 km || 
|-id=659 bgcolor=#E9E9E9
| 63659 ||  || — || August 17, 2001 || Socorro || LINEAR || — || align=right | 4.6 km || 
|-id=660 bgcolor=#d6d6d6
| 63660 ||  || — || August 18, 2001 || Socorro || LINEAR || KOR || align=right | 4.7 km || 
|-id=661 bgcolor=#d6d6d6
| 63661 ||  || — || August 18, 2001 || Socorro || LINEAR || — || align=right | 5.2 km || 
|-id=662 bgcolor=#fefefe
| 63662 ||  || — || August 18, 2001 || Socorro || LINEAR || — || align=right | 2.0 km || 
|-id=663 bgcolor=#d6d6d6
| 63663 ||  || — || August 19, 2001 || Socorro || LINEAR || — || align=right | 9.7 km || 
|-id=664 bgcolor=#E9E9E9
| 63664 ||  || — || August 19, 2001 || Socorro || LINEAR || — || align=right | 3.9 km || 
|-id=665 bgcolor=#fefefe
| 63665 ||  || — || August 19, 2001 || Socorro || LINEAR || NYS || align=right | 1.4 km || 
|-id=666 bgcolor=#fefefe
| 63666 ||  || — || August 20, 2001 || Socorro || LINEAR || V || align=right | 1.6 km || 
|-id=667 bgcolor=#d6d6d6
| 63667 ||  || — || August 20, 2001 || Socorro || LINEAR || — || align=right | 6.8 km || 
|-id=668 bgcolor=#E9E9E9
| 63668 ||  || — || August 20, 2001 || Socorro || LINEAR || — || align=right | 6.0 km || 
|-id=669 bgcolor=#fefefe
| 63669 ||  || — || August 20, 2001 || Socorro || LINEAR || NYS || align=right | 4.4 km || 
|-id=670 bgcolor=#d6d6d6
| 63670 ||  || — || August 20, 2001 || Socorro || LINEAR || EOS || align=right | 5.8 km || 
|-id=671 bgcolor=#d6d6d6
| 63671 ||  || — || August 20, 2001 || Socorro || LINEAR || EOS || align=right | 3.8 km || 
|-id=672 bgcolor=#E9E9E9
| 63672 ||  || — || August 22, 2001 || Socorro || LINEAR || — || align=right | 3.1 km || 
|-id=673 bgcolor=#fefefe
| 63673 ||  || — || August 22, 2001 || Socorro || LINEAR || — || align=right | 2.3 km || 
|-id=674 bgcolor=#E9E9E9
| 63674 ||  || — || August 22, 2001 || Socorro || LINEAR || — || align=right | 2.8 km || 
|-id=675 bgcolor=#fefefe
| 63675 ||  || — || August 22, 2001 || Socorro || LINEAR || V || align=right | 1.9 km || 
|-id=676 bgcolor=#fefefe
| 63676 ||  || — || August 22, 2001 || Socorro || LINEAR || — || align=right | 2.6 km || 
|-id=677 bgcolor=#fefefe
| 63677 ||  || — || August 22, 2001 || Socorro || LINEAR || V || align=right | 2.3 km || 
|-id=678 bgcolor=#d6d6d6
| 63678 ||  || — || August 22, 2001 || Socorro || LINEAR || EOS || align=right | 6.2 km || 
|-id=679 bgcolor=#fefefe
| 63679 ||  || — || August 24, 2001 || Kitt Peak || Spacewatch || MAS || align=right | 1.2 km || 
|-id=680 bgcolor=#d6d6d6
| 63680 ||  || — || August 20, 2001 || Palomar || NEAT || — || align=right | 7.8 km || 
|-id=681 bgcolor=#fefefe
| 63681 ||  || — || August 20, 2001 || Palomar || NEAT || — || align=right | 2.8 km || 
|-id=682 bgcolor=#E9E9E9
| 63682 ||  || — || August 20, 2001 || Palomar || NEAT || EUN || align=right | 4.1 km || 
|-id=683 bgcolor=#d6d6d6
| 63683 ||  || — || August 25, 2001 || Palomar || NEAT || — || align=right | 7.0 km || 
|-id=684 bgcolor=#d6d6d6
| 63684 ||  || — || August 25, 2001 || Desert Eagle || W. K. Y. Yeung || KOR || align=right | 4.4 km || 
|-id=685 bgcolor=#E9E9E9
| 63685 ||  || — || August 26, 2001 || Desert Eagle || W. K. Y. Yeung || — || align=right | 2.1 km || 
|-id=686 bgcolor=#fefefe
| 63686 ||  || — || August 26, 2001 || Ondřejov || P. Kušnirák || — || align=right | 1.7 km || 
|-id=687 bgcolor=#E9E9E9
| 63687 ||  || — || August 30, 2001 || Ondřejov || L. Kotková || — || align=right | 6.1 km || 
|-id=688 bgcolor=#d6d6d6
| 63688 ||  || — || August 28, 2001 || Kleť || Kleť Obs. || — || align=right | 5.4 km || 
|-id=689 bgcolor=#fefefe
| 63689 ||  || — || August 23, 2001 || Anderson Mesa || LONEOS || — || align=right | 1.9 km || 
|-id=690 bgcolor=#d6d6d6
| 63690 ||  || — || August 23, 2001 || Anderson Mesa || LONEOS || — || align=right | 5.6 km || 
|-id=691 bgcolor=#d6d6d6
| 63691 ||  || — || August 23, 2001 || Anderson Mesa || LONEOS || — || align=right | 5.2 km || 
|-id=692 bgcolor=#fefefe
| 63692 ||  || — || August 23, 2001 || Anderson Mesa || LONEOS || MAS || align=right | 1.2 km || 
|-id=693 bgcolor=#E9E9E9
| 63693 ||  || — || August 23, 2001 || Anderson Mesa || LONEOS || — || align=right | 1.8 km || 
|-id=694 bgcolor=#E9E9E9
| 63694 ||  || — || August 24, 2001 || Haleakala || NEAT || — || align=right | 4.7 km || 
|-id=695 bgcolor=#fefefe
| 63695 ||  || — || August 25, 2001 || Palomar || NEAT || — || align=right | 2.7 km || 
|-id=696 bgcolor=#fefefe
| 63696 ||  || — || August 22, 2001 || Socorro || LINEAR || FLO || align=right | 2.0 km || 
|-id=697 bgcolor=#d6d6d6
| 63697 ||  || — || August 26, 2001 || Haleakala || NEAT || EOS || align=right | 4.5 km || 
|-id=698 bgcolor=#E9E9E9
| 63698 ||  || — || August 28, 2001 || Palomar || NEAT || — || align=right | 7.3 km || 
|-id=699 bgcolor=#d6d6d6
| 63699 ||  || — || August 27, 2001 || Palomar || NEAT || — || align=right | 6.5 km || 
|-id=700 bgcolor=#E9E9E9
| 63700 ||  || — || August 27, 2001 || Palomar || NEAT || — || align=right | 3.3 km || 
|}

63701–63800 

|-bgcolor=#fefefe
| 63701 ||  || — || August 30, 2001 || Palomar || NEAT || — || align=right | 2.1 km || 
|-id=702 bgcolor=#fefefe
| 63702 ||  || — || August 29, 2001 || Palomar || NEAT || V || align=right | 2.6 km || 
|-id=703 bgcolor=#d6d6d6
| 63703 ||  || — || August 21, 2001 || Socorro || LINEAR || — || align=right | 5.2 km || 
|-id=704 bgcolor=#fefefe
| 63704 ||  || — || August 21, 2001 || Haleakala || NEAT || PHO || align=right | 2.1 km || 
|-id=705 bgcolor=#E9E9E9
| 63705 ||  || — || August 22, 2001 || Socorro || LINEAR || — || align=right | 5.3 km || 
|-id=706 bgcolor=#fefefe
| 63706 ||  || — || August 22, 2001 || Palomar || NEAT || PHO || align=right | 2.6 km || 
|-id=707 bgcolor=#E9E9E9
| 63707 ||  || — || August 22, 2001 || Socorro || LINEAR || — || align=right | 4.9 km || 
|-id=708 bgcolor=#fefefe
| 63708 ||  || — || August 22, 2001 || Socorro || LINEAR || — || align=right | 2.3 km || 
|-id=709 bgcolor=#fefefe
| 63709 ||  || — || August 22, 2001 || Socorro || LINEAR || V || align=right | 1.7 km || 
|-id=710 bgcolor=#fefefe
| 63710 ||  || — || August 22, 2001 || Socorro || LINEAR || FLO || align=right | 1.5 km || 
|-id=711 bgcolor=#fefefe
| 63711 ||  || — || August 22, 2001 || Socorro || LINEAR || — || align=right | 2.1 km || 
|-id=712 bgcolor=#E9E9E9
| 63712 ||  || — || August 22, 2001 || Palomar || NEAT || MAR || align=right | 2.5 km || 
|-id=713 bgcolor=#d6d6d6
| 63713 ||  || — || August 23, 2001 || Anderson Mesa || LONEOS || — || align=right | 6.8 km || 
|-id=714 bgcolor=#fefefe
| 63714 ||  || — || August 23, 2001 || Anderson Mesa || LONEOS || FLO || align=right | 1.0 km || 
|-id=715 bgcolor=#fefefe
| 63715 ||  || — || August 23, 2001 || Anderson Mesa || LONEOS || NYS || align=right | 1.3 km || 
|-id=716 bgcolor=#fefefe
| 63716 ||  || — || August 23, 2001 || Anderson Mesa || LONEOS || — || align=right | 2.0 km || 
|-id=717 bgcolor=#E9E9E9
| 63717 ||  || — || August 24, 2001 || Anderson Mesa || LONEOS || — || align=right | 4.7 km || 
|-id=718 bgcolor=#d6d6d6
| 63718 ||  || — || August 24, 2001 || Anderson Mesa || LONEOS || — || align=right | 4.5 km || 
|-id=719 bgcolor=#d6d6d6
| 63719 ||  || — || August 24, 2001 || Anderson Mesa || LONEOS || EOS || align=right | 4.4 km || 
|-id=720 bgcolor=#fefefe
| 63720 ||  || — || August 24, 2001 || Desert Eagle || W. K. Y. Yeung || V || align=right | 1.4 km || 
|-id=721 bgcolor=#d6d6d6
| 63721 ||  || — || August 24, 2001 || Socorro || LINEAR || THM || align=right | 7.1 km || 
|-id=722 bgcolor=#d6d6d6
| 63722 ||  || — || August 24, 2001 || Socorro || LINEAR || — || align=right | 7.7 km || 
|-id=723 bgcolor=#fefefe
| 63723 ||  || — || August 24, 2001 || Socorro || LINEAR || V || align=right | 1.1 km || 
|-id=724 bgcolor=#d6d6d6
| 63724 ||  || — || August 24, 2001 || Socorro || LINEAR || EOS || align=right | 5.7 km || 
|-id=725 bgcolor=#d6d6d6
| 63725 ||  || — || August 24, 2001 || Socorro || LINEAR || EOS || align=right | 5.0 km || 
|-id=726 bgcolor=#E9E9E9
| 63726 ||  || — || August 24, 2001 || Socorro || LINEAR || NEM || align=right | 3.6 km || 
|-id=727 bgcolor=#d6d6d6
| 63727 ||  || — || August 24, 2001 || Socorro || LINEAR || KOR || align=right | 3.8 km || 
|-id=728 bgcolor=#fefefe
| 63728 ||  || — || August 24, 2001 || Socorro || LINEAR || NYS || align=right | 1.4 km || 
|-id=729 bgcolor=#fefefe
| 63729 ||  || — || August 24, 2001 || Socorro || LINEAR || — || align=right | 2.4 km || 
|-id=730 bgcolor=#fefefe
| 63730 ||  || — || August 24, 2001 || Socorro || LINEAR || NYS || align=right | 2.4 km || 
|-id=731 bgcolor=#d6d6d6
| 63731 ||  || — || August 24, 2001 || Socorro || LINEAR || KOR || align=right | 4.4 km || 
|-id=732 bgcolor=#d6d6d6
| 63732 ||  || — || August 24, 2001 || Socorro || LINEAR || — || align=right | 3.7 km || 
|-id=733 bgcolor=#d6d6d6
| 63733 ||  || — || August 24, 2001 || Socorro || LINEAR || — || align=right | 7.3 km || 
|-id=734 bgcolor=#fefefe
| 63734 ||  || — || August 24, 2001 || Socorro || LINEAR || — || align=right | 2.3 km || 
|-id=735 bgcolor=#E9E9E9
| 63735 ||  || — || August 24, 2001 || Socorro || LINEAR || PAE || align=right | 7.0 km || 
|-id=736 bgcolor=#d6d6d6
| 63736 ||  || — || August 24, 2001 || Socorro || LINEAR || — || align=right | 7.1 km || 
|-id=737 bgcolor=#fefefe
| 63737 ||  || — || August 24, 2001 || Socorro || LINEAR || FLO || align=right | 1.4 km || 
|-id=738 bgcolor=#E9E9E9
| 63738 ||  || — || August 24, 2001 || Haleakala || NEAT || — || align=right | 3.0 km || 
|-id=739 bgcolor=#fefefe
| 63739 ||  || — || August 25, 2001 || Socorro || LINEAR || — || align=right | 2.5 km || 
|-id=740 bgcolor=#fefefe
| 63740 ||  || — || August 25, 2001 || Socorro || LINEAR || — || align=right | 2.1 km || 
|-id=741 bgcolor=#fefefe
| 63741 ||  || — || August 25, 2001 || Anderson Mesa || LONEOS || — || align=right | 1.9 km || 
|-id=742 bgcolor=#d6d6d6
| 63742 ||  || — || August 25, 2001 || Socorro || LINEAR || — || align=right | 7.2 km || 
|-id=743 bgcolor=#d6d6d6
| 63743 ||  || — || August 25, 2001 || Socorro || LINEAR || — || align=right | 4.8 km || 
|-id=744 bgcolor=#E9E9E9
| 63744 ||  || — || August 25, 2001 || Socorro || LINEAR || — || align=right | 3.1 km || 
|-id=745 bgcolor=#fefefe
| 63745 ||  || — || August 25, 2001 || Socorro || LINEAR || — || align=right | 1.9 km || 
|-id=746 bgcolor=#fefefe
| 63746 ||  || — || August 25, 2001 || Socorro || LINEAR || — || align=right | 2.5 km || 
|-id=747 bgcolor=#E9E9E9
| 63747 ||  || — || August 25, 2001 || Socorro || LINEAR || — || align=right | 3.2 km || 
|-id=748 bgcolor=#fefefe
| 63748 ||  || — || August 25, 2001 || Desert Eagle || W. K. Y. Yeung || NYS || align=right | 1.8 km || 
|-id=749 bgcolor=#fefefe
| 63749 ||  || — || August 25, 2001 || Anderson Mesa || LONEOS || — || align=right | 2.6 km || 
|-id=750 bgcolor=#fefefe
| 63750 ||  || — || August 25, 2001 || Anderson Mesa || LONEOS || FLO || align=right | 1.7 km || 
|-id=751 bgcolor=#d6d6d6
| 63751 ||  || — || August 26, 2001 || Haleakala || NEAT || KOR || align=right | 2.9 km || 
|-id=752 bgcolor=#E9E9E9
| 63752 ||  || — || August 26, 2001 || Socorro || LINEAR || — || align=right | 4.9 km || 
|-id=753 bgcolor=#fefefe
| 63753 ||  || — || August 26, 2001 || Socorro || LINEAR || NYS || align=right | 3.4 km || 
|-id=754 bgcolor=#fefefe
| 63754 ||  || — || August 20, 2001 || Palomar || NEAT || H || align=right | 1.6 km || 
|-id=755 bgcolor=#d6d6d6
| 63755 ||  || — || August 20, 2001 || Socorro || LINEAR || — || align=right | 6.2 km || 
|-id=756 bgcolor=#fefefe
| 63756 ||  || — || August 20, 2001 || Haleakala || NEAT || — || align=right | 2.5 km || 
|-id=757 bgcolor=#d6d6d6
| 63757 ||  || — || August 19, 2001 || Socorro || LINEAR || TEL || align=right | 3.6 km || 
|-id=758 bgcolor=#d6d6d6
| 63758 ||  || — || August 19, 2001 || Socorro || LINEAR || — || align=right | 10 km || 
|-id=759 bgcolor=#d6d6d6
| 63759 ||  || — || August 19, 2001 || Socorro || LINEAR || — || align=right | 7.7 km || 
|-id=760 bgcolor=#fefefe
| 63760 ||  || — || August 19, 2001 || Anderson Mesa || LONEOS || — || align=right | 2.1 km || 
|-id=761 bgcolor=#fefefe
| 63761 ||  || — || August 19, 2001 || Anderson Mesa || LONEOS || V || align=right | 1.7 km || 
|-id=762 bgcolor=#fefefe
| 63762 ||  || — || August 19, 2001 || Haleakala || NEAT || H || align=right | 1.4 km || 
|-id=763 bgcolor=#E9E9E9
| 63763 ||  || — || August 18, 2001 || Palomar || NEAT || WIT || align=right | 2.8 km || 
|-id=764 bgcolor=#fefefe
| 63764 ||  || — || August 18, 2001 || Anderson Mesa || LONEOS || NYS || align=right | 1.5 km || 
|-id=765 bgcolor=#fefefe
| 63765 ||  || — || August 18, 2001 || Anderson Mesa || LONEOS || — || align=right | 2.7 km || 
|-id=766 bgcolor=#E9E9E9
| 63766 ||  || — || August 30, 2001 || Palomar || NEAT || — || align=right | 3.2 km || 
|-id=767 bgcolor=#E9E9E9
| 63767 ||  || — || August 16, 2001 || Socorro || LINEAR || — || align=right | 3.0 km || 
|-id=768 bgcolor=#E9E9E9
| 63768 ||  || — || August 16, 2001 || Socorro || LINEAR || — || align=right | 2.0 km || 
|-id=769 bgcolor=#fefefe
| 63769 ||  || — || August 16, 2001 || Socorro || LINEAR || — || align=right | 5.5 km || 
|-id=770 bgcolor=#E9E9E9
| 63770 ||  || — || August 25, 2001 || Bergisch Gladbach || W. Bickel || — || align=right | 3.2 km || 
|-id=771 bgcolor=#E9E9E9
| 63771 ||  || — || August 24, 2001 || Anderson Mesa || LONEOS || — || align=right | 5.5 km || 
|-id=772 bgcolor=#E9E9E9
| 63772 ||  || — || August 24, 2001 || Anderson Mesa || LONEOS || — || align=right | 3.9 km || 
|-id=773 bgcolor=#fefefe
| 63773 ||  || — || August 24, 2001 || Socorro || LINEAR || MAS || align=right | 2.2 km || 
|-id=774 bgcolor=#fefefe
| 63774 ||  || — || August 24, 2001 || Socorro || LINEAR || — || align=right | 2.2 km || 
|-id=775 bgcolor=#E9E9E9
| 63775 ||  || — || August 24, 2001 || Socorro || LINEAR || — || align=right | 5.8 km || 
|-id=776 bgcolor=#E9E9E9
| 63776 ||  || — || August 24, 2001 || Anderson Mesa || LONEOS || — || align=right | 5.9 km || 
|-id=777 bgcolor=#d6d6d6
| 63777 ||  || — || September 7, 2001 || Socorro || LINEAR || EOS || align=right | 4.2 km || 
|-id=778 bgcolor=#d6d6d6
| 63778 ||  || — || September 7, 2001 || Socorro || LINEAR || — || align=right | 5.3 km || 
|-id=779 bgcolor=#E9E9E9
| 63779 ||  || — || September 7, 2001 || Socorro || LINEAR || — || align=right | 3.0 km || 
|-id=780 bgcolor=#fefefe
| 63780 ||  || — || September 8, 2001 || Socorro || LINEAR || SUL || align=right | 3.4 km || 
|-id=781 bgcolor=#fefefe
| 63781 ||  || — || September 8, 2001 || Socorro || LINEAR || FLO || align=right | 3.1 km || 
|-id=782 bgcolor=#fefefe
| 63782 ||  || — || September 10, 2001 || Desert Eagle || W. K. Y. Yeung || — || align=right | 1.8 km || 
|-id=783 bgcolor=#E9E9E9
| 63783 ||  || — || September 8, 2001 || Socorro || LINEAR || HOF || align=right | 4.9 km || 
|-id=784 bgcolor=#fefefe
| 63784 ||  || — || September 8, 2001 || Socorro || LINEAR || PHO || align=right | 2.9 km || 
|-id=785 bgcolor=#d6d6d6
| 63785 ||  || — || September 10, 2001 || Desert Eagle || W. K. Y. Yeung || KOR || align=right | 3.4 km || 
|-id=786 bgcolor=#d6d6d6
| 63786 ||  || — || September 10, 2001 || Desert Eagle || W. K. Y. Yeung || — || align=right | 5.4 km || 
|-id=787 bgcolor=#E9E9E9
| 63787 ||  || — || September 11, 2001 || Desert Eagle || W. K. Y. Yeung || GEF || align=right | 2.3 km || 
|-id=788 bgcolor=#fefefe
| 63788 ||  || — || September 11, 2001 || Desert Eagle || W. K. Y. Yeung || — || align=right | 2.1 km || 
|-id=789 bgcolor=#fefefe
| 63789 ||  || — || September 7, 2001 || Socorro || LINEAR || H || align=right | 1.0 km || 
|-id=790 bgcolor=#fefefe
| 63790 ||  || — || September 7, 2001 || Socorro || LINEAR || — || align=right | 1.4 km || 
|-id=791 bgcolor=#E9E9E9
| 63791 ||  || — || September 7, 2001 || Socorro || LINEAR || — || align=right | 2.2 km || 
|-id=792 bgcolor=#E9E9E9
| 63792 ||  || — || September 7, 2001 || Socorro || LINEAR || — || align=right | 4.3 km || 
|-id=793 bgcolor=#d6d6d6
| 63793 ||  || — || September 7, 2001 || Socorro || LINEAR || K-2 || align=right | 3.5 km || 
|-id=794 bgcolor=#fefefe
| 63794 ||  || — || September 7, 2001 || Socorro || LINEAR || NYS || align=right | 1.1 km || 
|-id=795 bgcolor=#d6d6d6
| 63795 ||  || — || September 7, 2001 || Socorro || LINEAR || KOR || align=right | 2.9 km || 
|-id=796 bgcolor=#E9E9E9
| 63796 ||  || — || September 7, 2001 || Socorro || LINEAR || — || align=right | 4.6 km || 
|-id=797 bgcolor=#E9E9E9
| 63797 ||  || — || September 7, 2001 || Socorro || LINEAR || AGN || align=right | 3.7 km || 
|-id=798 bgcolor=#fefefe
| 63798 ||  || — || September 7, 2001 || Socorro || LINEAR || — || align=right | 1.6 km || 
|-id=799 bgcolor=#d6d6d6
| 63799 ||  || — || September 7, 2001 || Socorro || LINEAR || — || align=right | 6.2 km || 
|-id=800 bgcolor=#d6d6d6
| 63800 ||  || — || September 7, 2001 || Socorro || LINEAR || — || align=right | 6.3 km || 
|}

63801–63900 

|-bgcolor=#E9E9E9
| 63801 ||  || — || September 7, 2001 || Socorro || LINEAR || — || align=right | 8.5 km || 
|-id=802 bgcolor=#fefefe
| 63802 ||  || — || September 7, 2001 || Socorro || LINEAR || — || align=right | 3.4 km || 
|-id=803 bgcolor=#fefefe
| 63803 ||  || — || September 7, 2001 || Socorro || LINEAR || NYS || align=right | 1.3 km || 
|-id=804 bgcolor=#E9E9E9
| 63804 ||  || — || September 7, 2001 || Socorro || LINEAR || — || align=right | 2.6 km || 
|-id=805 bgcolor=#fefefe
| 63805 ||  || — || September 8, 2001 || Socorro || LINEAR || FLO || align=right | 1.3 km || 
|-id=806 bgcolor=#d6d6d6
| 63806 ||  || — || September 8, 2001 || Socorro || LINEAR || — || align=right | 5.7 km || 
|-id=807 bgcolor=#d6d6d6
| 63807 ||  || — || September 9, 2001 || Socorro || LINEAR || HYG || align=right | 7.8 km || 
|-id=808 bgcolor=#fefefe
| 63808 ||  || — || September 12, 2001 || Palomar || NEAT || V || align=right | 1.7 km || 
|-id=809 bgcolor=#fefefe
| 63809 ||  || — || September 13, 2001 || Palomar || NEAT || V || align=right | 2.1 km || 
|-id=810 bgcolor=#d6d6d6
| 63810 ||  || — || September 14, 2001 || Palomar || NEAT || — || align=right | 7.2 km || 
|-id=811 bgcolor=#fefefe
| 63811 ||  || — || September 14, 2001 || Palomar || NEAT || FLO || align=right | 2.4 km || 
|-id=812 bgcolor=#E9E9E9
| 63812 ||  || — || September 14, 2001 || Palomar || NEAT || — || align=right | 3.3 km || 
|-id=813 bgcolor=#fefefe
| 63813 ||  || — || September 14, 2001 || Palomar || NEAT || FLO || align=right | 1.5 km || 
|-id=814 bgcolor=#fefefe
| 63814 ||  || — || September 15, 2001 || Ametlla de Mar || J. Nomen || ERI || align=right | 4.4 km || 
|-id=815 bgcolor=#fefefe
| 63815 ||  || — || September 11, 2001 || Socorro || LINEAR || H || align=right | 1.2 km || 
|-id=816 bgcolor=#d6d6d6
| 63816 ||  || — || September 10, 2001 || Desert Eagle || W. K. Y. Yeung || KOR || align=right | 3.6 km || 
|-id=817 bgcolor=#fefefe
| 63817 ||  || — || September 12, 2001 || Socorro || LINEAR || — || align=right | 1.7 km || 
|-id=818 bgcolor=#fefefe
| 63818 ||  || — || September 11, 2001 || Desert Eagle || W. K. Y. Yeung || — || align=right | 1.7 km || 
|-id=819 bgcolor=#d6d6d6
| 63819 ||  || — || September 10, 2001 || Socorro || LINEAR || — || align=right | 5.5 km || 
|-id=820 bgcolor=#E9E9E9
| 63820 ||  || — || September 10, 2001 || Socorro || LINEAR || — || align=right | 2.3 km || 
|-id=821 bgcolor=#d6d6d6
| 63821 ||  || — || September 10, 2001 || Socorro || LINEAR || EOS || align=right | 6.0 km || 
|-id=822 bgcolor=#d6d6d6
| 63822 ||  || — || September 10, 2001 || Socorro || LINEAR || — || align=right | 8.7 km || 
|-id=823 bgcolor=#fefefe
| 63823 ||  || — || September 10, 2001 || Socorro || LINEAR || V || align=right | 1.2 km || 
|-id=824 bgcolor=#fefefe
| 63824 ||  || — || September 10, 2001 || Socorro || LINEAR || V || align=right | 1.9 km || 
|-id=825 bgcolor=#fefefe
| 63825 ||  || — || September 10, 2001 || Socorro || LINEAR || — || align=right | 2.0 km || 
|-id=826 bgcolor=#fefefe
| 63826 ||  || — || September 10, 2001 || Socorro || LINEAR || — || align=right | 2.1 km || 
|-id=827 bgcolor=#fefefe
| 63827 ||  || — || September 10, 2001 || Socorro || LINEAR || — || align=right | 1.7 km || 
|-id=828 bgcolor=#fefefe
| 63828 ||  || — || September 10, 2001 || Socorro || LINEAR || — || align=right | 2.0 km || 
|-id=829 bgcolor=#E9E9E9
| 63829 ||  || — || September 10, 2001 || Socorro || LINEAR || — || align=right | 4.5 km || 
|-id=830 bgcolor=#d6d6d6
| 63830 ||  || — || September 10, 2001 || Socorro || LINEAR || — || align=right | 4.9 km || 
|-id=831 bgcolor=#fefefe
| 63831 ||  || — || September 10, 2001 || Socorro || LINEAR || FLO || align=right | 1.6 km || 
|-id=832 bgcolor=#d6d6d6
| 63832 ||  || — || September 10, 2001 || Socorro || LINEAR || TIR || align=right | 7.1 km || 
|-id=833 bgcolor=#E9E9E9
| 63833 ||  || — || September 10, 2001 || Socorro || LINEAR || HOF || align=right | 6.1 km || 
|-id=834 bgcolor=#fefefe
| 63834 ||  || — || September 10, 2001 || Socorro || LINEAR || V || align=right | 2.6 km || 
|-id=835 bgcolor=#fefefe
| 63835 ||  || — || September 10, 2001 || Socorro || LINEAR || — || align=right | 1.8 km || 
|-id=836 bgcolor=#E9E9E9
| 63836 ||  || — || September 10, 2001 || Socorro || LINEAR || — || align=right | 4.3 km || 
|-id=837 bgcolor=#fefefe
| 63837 ||  || — || September 10, 2001 || Socorro || LINEAR || NYS || align=right | 1.8 km || 
|-id=838 bgcolor=#fefefe
| 63838 ||  || — || September 10, 2001 || Socorro || LINEAR || — || align=right | 1.9 km || 
|-id=839 bgcolor=#E9E9E9
| 63839 ||  || — || September 10, 2001 || Socorro || LINEAR || — || align=right | 3.1 km || 
|-id=840 bgcolor=#E9E9E9
| 63840 ||  || — || September 10, 2001 || Socorro || LINEAR || — || align=right | 2.5 km || 
|-id=841 bgcolor=#E9E9E9
| 63841 ||  || — || September 10, 2001 || Socorro || LINEAR || — || align=right | 3.9 km || 
|-id=842 bgcolor=#fefefe
| 63842 ||  || — || September 10, 2001 || Socorro || LINEAR || — || align=right | 3.2 km || 
|-id=843 bgcolor=#E9E9E9
| 63843 ||  || — || September 10, 2001 || Socorro || LINEAR || — || align=right | 3.6 km || 
|-id=844 bgcolor=#E9E9E9
| 63844 ||  || — || September 12, 2001 || Palomar || NEAT || — || align=right | 2.4 km || 
|-id=845 bgcolor=#E9E9E9
| 63845 ||  || — || September 14, 2001 || Palomar || NEAT || EUN || align=right | 4.0 km || 
|-id=846 bgcolor=#E9E9E9
| 63846 ||  || — || September 11, 2001 || Anderson Mesa || LONEOS || RAF || align=right | 2.5 km || 
|-id=847 bgcolor=#fefefe
| 63847 ||  || — || September 11, 2001 || Anderson Mesa || LONEOS || — || align=right | 1.2 km || 
|-id=848 bgcolor=#d6d6d6
| 63848 ||  || — || September 11, 2001 || Anderson Mesa || LONEOS || — || align=right | 6.3 km || 
|-id=849 bgcolor=#fefefe
| 63849 ||  || — || September 11, 2001 || Anderson Mesa || LONEOS || FLO || align=right | 1.6 km || 
|-id=850 bgcolor=#fefefe
| 63850 ||  || — || September 11, 2001 || Anderson Mesa || LONEOS || FLO || align=right | 1.6 km || 
|-id=851 bgcolor=#fefefe
| 63851 ||  || — || September 11, 2001 || Anderson Mesa || LONEOS || NYS || align=right | 1.5 km || 
|-id=852 bgcolor=#d6d6d6
| 63852 ||  || — || September 11, 2001 || Anderson Mesa || LONEOS || KOR || align=right | 4.1 km || 
|-id=853 bgcolor=#fefefe
| 63853 ||  || — || September 11, 2001 || Anderson Mesa || LONEOS || — || align=right | 1.8 km || 
|-id=854 bgcolor=#E9E9E9
| 63854 ||  || — || September 11, 2001 || Anderson Mesa || LONEOS || — || align=right | 3.4 km || 
|-id=855 bgcolor=#fefefe
| 63855 ||  || — || September 11, 2001 || Anderson Mesa || LONEOS || NYS || align=right | 1.4 km || 
|-id=856 bgcolor=#d6d6d6
| 63856 ||  || — || September 11, 2001 || Anderson Mesa || LONEOS || — || align=right | 7.1 km || 
|-id=857 bgcolor=#E9E9E9
| 63857 ||  || — || September 11, 2001 || Anderson Mesa || LONEOS || PAD || align=right | 4.3 km || 
|-id=858 bgcolor=#fefefe
| 63858 ||  || — || September 11, 2001 || Anderson Mesa || LONEOS || — || align=right | 1.3 km || 
|-id=859 bgcolor=#fefefe
| 63859 ||  || — || September 11, 2001 || Anderson Mesa || LONEOS || — || align=right | 1.9 km || 
|-id=860 bgcolor=#d6d6d6
| 63860 ||  || — || September 11, 2001 || Anderson Mesa || LONEOS || — || align=right | 6.0 km || 
|-id=861 bgcolor=#fefefe
| 63861 ||  || — || September 11, 2001 || Anderson Mesa || LONEOS || — || align=right | 1.8 km || 
|-id=862 bgcolor=#d6d6d6
| 63862 ||  || — || September 12, 2001 || Socorro || LINEAR || — || align=right | 5.3 km || 
|-id=863 bgcolor=#fefefe
| 63863 ||  || — || September 12, 2001 || Socorro || LINEAR || FLO || align=right | 1.1 km || 
|-id=864 bgcolor=#fefefe
| 63864 ||  || — || September 12, 2001 || Socorro || LINEAR || — || align=right | 1.7 km || 
|-id=865 bgcolor=#d6d6d6
| 63865 ||  || — || September 12, 2001 || Socorro || LINEAR || — || align=right | 5.2 km || 
|-id=866 bgcolor=#d6d6d6
| 63866 ||  || — || September 12, 2001 || Socorro || LINEAR || — || align=right | 6.0 km || 
|-id=867 bgcolor=#d6d6d6
| 63867 ||  || — || September 12, 2001 || Socorro || LINEAR || — || align=right | 6.7 km || 
|-id=868 bgcolor=#fefefe
| 63868 ||  || — || September 12, 2001 || Socorro || LINEAR || FLO || align=right | 1.1 km || 
|-id=869 bgcolor=#fefefe
| 63869 ||  || — || September 12, 2001 || Socorro || LINEAR || FLO || align=right | 1.3 km || 
|-id=870 bgcolor=#fefefe
| 63870 ||  || — || September 12, 2001 || Socorro || LINEAR || NYS || align=right | 1.5 km || 
|-id=871 bgcolor=#E9E9E9
| 63871 ||  || — || September 12, 2001 || Socorro || LINEAR || — || align=right | 3.4 km || 
|-id=872 bgcolor=#E9E9E9
| 63872 ||  || — || September 12, 2001 || Socorro || LINEAR || — || align=right | 3.1 km || 
|-id=873 bgcolor=#d6d6d6
| 63873 ||  || — || September 12, 2001 || Socorro || LINEAR || — || align=right | 5.2 km || 
|-id=874 bgcolor=#E9E9E9
| 63874 ||  || — || September 12, 2001 || Socorro || LINEAR || — || align=right | 3.4 km || 
|-id=875 bgcolor=#d6d6d6
| 63875 ||  || — || September 12, 2001 || Socorro || LINEAR || — || align=right | 7.6 km || 
|-id=876 bgcolor=#d6d6d6
| 63876 ||  || — || September 12, 2001 || Socorro || LINEAR || — || align=right | 6.4 km || 
|-id=877 bgcolor=#fefefe
| 63877 ||  || — || September 12, 2001 || Socorro || LINEAR || FLO || align=right | 1.7 km || 
|-id=878 bgcolor=#fefefe
| 63878 ||  || — || September 12, 2001 || Socorro || LINEAR || — || align=right | 2.8 km || 
|-id=879 bgcolor=#E9E9E9
| 63879 ||  || — || September 13, 2001 || Palomar || NEAT || — || align=right | 3.9 km || 
|-id=880 bgcolor=#E9E9E9
| 63880 ||  || — || September 14, 2001 || Palomar || NEAT || DOR || align=right | 8.0 km || 
|-id=881 bgcolor=#E9E9E9
| 63881 ||  || — || September 7, 2001 || Anderson Mesa || LONEOS || — || align=right | 2.1 km || 
|-id=882 bgcolor=#E9E9E9
| 63882 ||  || — || September 11, 2001 || Socorro || LINEAR || — || align=right | 4.7 km || 
|-id=883 bgcolor=#d6d6d6
| 63883 || 2001 SO || — || September 16, 2001 || Fountain Hills || C. W. Juels, P. R. Holvorcem || KOR || align=right | 5.0 km || 
|-id=884 bgcolor=#E9E9E9
| 63884 ||  || — || September 17, 2001 || Desert Eagle || W. K. Y. Yeung || — || align=right | 3.4 km || 
|-id=885 bgcolor=#fefefe
| 63885 ||  || — || September 17, 2001 || Desert Eagle || W. K. Y. Yeung || — || align=right | 2.4 km || 
|-id=886 bgcolor=#fefefe
| 63886 ||  || — || September 17, 2001 || Desert Eagle || W. K. Y. Yeung || V || align=right | 1.6 km || 
|-id=887 bgcolor=#d6d6d6
| 63887 ||  || — || September 17, 2001 || Desert Eagle || W. K. Y. Yeung || — || align=right | 13 km || 
|-id=888 bgcolor=#d6d6d6
| 63888 ||  || — || September 17, 2001 || Desert Eagle || W. K. Y. Yeung || HYG || align=right | 6.3 km || 
|-id=889 bgcolor=#d6d6d6
| 63889 ||  || — || September 17, 2001 || Desert Eagle || W. K. Y. Yeung || KOR || align=right | 3.1 km || 
|-id=890 bgcolor=#E9E9E9
| 63890 ||  || — || September 16, 2001 || Socorro || LINEAR || — || align=right | 1.7 km || 
|-id=891 bgcolor=#d6d6d6
| 63891 ||  || — || September 18, 2001 || Goodricke-Pigott || R. A. Tucker || LUT || align=right | 10 km || 
|-id=892 bgcolor=#d6d6d6
| 63892 ||  || — || September 18, 2001 || Fountain Hills || C. W. Juels, P. R. Holvorcem || INA || align=right | 12 km || 
|-id=893 bgcolor=#d6d6d6
| 63893 ||  || — || September 18, 2001 || Fountain Hills || Fountain Hills Obs. || — || align=right | 9.1 km || 
|-id=894 bgcolor=#fefefe
| 63894 ||  || — || September 16, 2001 || Socorro || LINEAR || NYS || align=right | 1.5 km || 
|-id=895 bgcolor=#d6d6d6
| 63895 ||  || — || September 18, 2001 || Ondřejov || P. Kušnirák || — || align=right | 9.1 km || 
|-id=896 bgcolor=#fefefe
| 63896 ||  || — || September 19, 2001 || Fountain Hills || C. W. Juels, P. R. Holvorcem || FLO || align=right | 1.8 km || 
|-id=897 bgcolor=#fefefe
| 63897 Ofunato ||  ||  || September 18, 2001 || Bisei SG Center || BATTeRS || FLO || align=right | 1.8 km || 
|-id=898 bgcolor=#d6d6d6
| 63898 ||  || — || September 19, 2001 || Needville || Needville Obs. || — || align=right | 5.4 km || 
|-id=899 bgcolor=#fefefe
| 63899 ||  || — || September 16, 2001 || Socorro || LINEAR || — || align=right | 2.1 km || 
|-id=900 bgcolor=#fefefe
| 63900 ||  || — || September 16, 2001 || Socorro || LINEAR || — || align=right | 3.9 km || 
|}

63901–64000 

|-bgcolor=#d6d6d6
| 63901 ||  || — || September 16, 2001 || Socorro || LINEAR || VER || align=right | 7.2 km || 
|-id=902 bgcolor=#fefefe
| 63902 ||  || — || September 16, 2001 || Socorro || LINEAR || — || align=right | 2.1 km || 
|-id=903 bgcolor=#d6d6d6
| 63903 ||  || — || September 16, 2001 || Socorro || LINEAR || THM || align=right | 7.1 km || 
|-id=904 bgcolor=#fefefe
| 63904 ||  || — || September 16, 2001 || Socorro || LINEAR || — || align=right | 1.3 km || 
|-id=905 bgcolor=#fefefe
| 63905 ||  || — || September 16, 2001 || Socorro || LINEAR || FLO || align=right | 1.8 km || 
|-id=906 bgcolor=#d6d6d6
| 63906 ||  || — || September 16, 2001 || Socorro || LINEAR || — || align=right | 5.9 km || 
|-id=907 bgcolor=#fefefe
| 63907 ||  || — || September 16, 2001 || Socorro || LINEAR || FLO || align=right | 2.1 km || 
|-id=908 bgcolor=#d6d6d6
| 63908 ||  || — || September 16, 2001 || Socorro || LINEAR || KOR || align=right | 3.8 km || 
|-id=909 bgcolor=#E9E9E9
| 63909 ||  || — || September 16, 2001 || Socorro || LINEAR || PAD || align=right | 3.5 km || 
|-id=910 bgcolor=#E9E9E9
| 63910 ||  || — || September 16, 2001 || Socorro || LINEAR || — || align=right | 5.0 km || 
|-id=911 bgcolor=#d6d6d6
| 63911 ||  || — || September 16, 2001 || Socorro || LINEAR || — || align=right | 7.2 km || 
|-id=912 bgcolor=#fefefe
| 63912 ||  || — || September 16, 2001 || Socorro || LINEAR || — || align=right | 1.8 km || 
|-id=913 bgcolor=#d6d6d6
| 63913 ||  || — || September 16, 2001 || Socorro || LINEAR || — || align=right | 5.5 km || 
|-id=914 bgcolor=#fefefe
| 63914 ||  || — || September 16, 2001 || Socorro || LINEAR || NYS || align=right | 1.9 km || 
|-id=915 bgcolor=#fefefe
| 63915 ||  || — || September 16, 2001 || Socorro || LINEAR || — || align=right | 1.8 km || 
|-id=916 bgcolor=#E9E9E9
| 63916 ||  || — || September 16, 2001 || Socorro || LINEAR || — || align=right | 3.8 km || 
|-id=917 bgcolor=#d6d6d6
| 63917 ||  || — || September 16, 2001 || Socorro || LINEAR || — || align=right | 3.4 km || 
|-id=918 bgcolor=#d6d6d6
| 63918 ||  || — || September 16, 2001 || Socorro || LINEAR || — || align=right | 7.9 km || 
|-id=919 bgcolor=#fefefe
| 63919 ||  || — || September 16, 2001 || Socorro || LINEAR || — || align=right | 2.2 km || 
|-id=920 bgcolor=#fefefe
| 63920 ||  || — || September 16, 2001 || Socorro || LINEAR || — || align=right | 1.6 km || 
|-id=921 bgcolor=#fefefe
| 63921 ||  || — || September 16, 2001 || Socorro || LINEAR || FLO || align=right | 1.7 km || 
|-id=922 bgcolor=#E9E9E9
| 63922 ||  || — || September 16, 2001 || Socorro || LINEAR || — || align=right | 5.2 km || 
|-id=923 bgcolor=#C2FFFF
| 63923 ||  || — || September 16, 2001 || Socorro || LINEAR || L5 || align=right | 16 km || 
|-id=924 bgcolor=#fefefe
| 63924 ||  || — || September 16, 2001 || Socorro || LINEAR || MAS || align=right | 1.3 km || 
|-id=925 bgcolor=#E9E9E9
| 63925 ||  || — || September 16, 2001 || Socorro || LINEAR || — || align=right | 5.7 km || 
|-id=926 bgcolor=#E9E9E9
| 63926 ||  || — || September 16, 2001 || Socorro || LINEAR || — || align=right | 6.1 km || 
|-id=927 bgcolor=#E9E9E9
| 63927 ||  || — || September 16, 2001 || Socorro || LINEAR || — || align=right | 1.8 km || 
|-id=928 bgcolor=#E9E9E9
| 63928 ||  || — || September 16, 2001 || Socorro || LINEAR || HEN || align=right | 2.3 km || 
|-id=929 bgcolor=#fefefe
| 63929 ||  || — || September 16, 2001 || Socorro || LINEAR || — || align=right | 2.7 km || 
|-id=930 bgcolor=#fefefe
| 63930 ||  || — || September 16, 2001 || Socorro || LINEAR || V || align=right | 1.3 km || 
|-id=931 bgcolor=#fefefe
| 63931 ||  || — || September 16, 2001 || Socorro || LINEAR || ERI || align=right | 2.9 km || 
|-id=932 bgcolor=#d6d6d6
| 63932 ||  || — || September 16, 2001 || Socorro || LINEAR || — || align=right | 3.3 km || 
|-id=933 bgcolor=#E9E9E9
| 63933 ||  || — || September 16, 2001 || Socorro || LINEAR || PAD || align=right | 6.7 km || 
|-id=934 bgcolor=#fefefe
| 63934 ||  || — || September 16, 2001 || Socorro || LINEAR || FLO || align=right | 1.8 km || 
|-id=935 bgcolor=#E9E9E9
| 63935 ||  || — || September 16, 2001 || Socorro || LINEAR || — || align=right | 3.2 km || 
|-id=936 bgcolor=#d6d6d6
| 63936 ||  || — || September 16, 2001 || Socorro || LINEAR || EOS || align=right | 6.4 km || 
|-id=937 bgcolor=#E9E9E9
| 63937 ||  || — || September 16, 2001 || Socorro || LINEAR || — || align=right | 2.4 km || 
|-id=938 bgcolor=#fefefe
| 63938 ||  || — || September 16, 2001 || Socorro || LINEAR || FLO || align=right | 1.3 km || 
|-id=939 bgcolor=#fefefe
| 63939 ||  || — || September 16, 2001 || Socorro || LINEAR || FLO || align=right | 1.4 km || 
|-id=940 bgcolor=#d6d6d6
| 63940 ||  || — || September 16, 2001 || Socorro || LINEAR || — || align=right | 6.8 km || 
|-id=941 bgcolor=#fefefe
| 63941 ||  || — || September 16, 2001 || Socorro || LINEAR || — || align=right | 1.9 km || 
|-id=942 bgcolor=#d6d6d6
| 63942 ||  || — || September 16, 2001 || Socorro || LINEAR || — || align=right | 7.8 km || 
|-id=943 bgcolor=#d6d6d6
| 63943 ||  || — || September 16, 2001 || Socorro || LINEAR || — || align=right | 6.2 km || 
|-id=944 bgcolor=#fefefe
| 63944 ||  || — || September 17, 2001 || Socorro || LINEAR || NYS || align=right | 2.0 km || 
|-id=945 bgcolor=#E9E9E9
| 63945 ||  || — || September 17, 2001 || Socorro || LINEAR || — || align=right | 6.2 km || 
|-id=946 bgcolor=#fefefe
| 63946 ||  || — || September 17, 2001 || Socorro || LINEAR || NYS || align=right | 1.2 km || 
|-id=947 bgcolor=#fefefe
| 63947 ||  || — || September 17, 2001 || Socorro || LINEAR || V || align=right | 1.6 km || 
|-id=948 bgcolor=#fefefe
| 63948 ||  || — || September 17, 2001 || Socorro || LINEAR || FLO || align=right | 4.3 km || 
|-id=949 bgcolor=#fefefe
| 63949 ||  || — || September 17, 2001 || Socorro || LINEAR || — || align=right | 1.6 km || 
|-id=950 bgcolor=#fefefe
| 63950 ||  || — || September 17, 2001 || Socorro || LINEAR || MAS || align=right | 2.1 km || 
|-id=951 bgcolor=#d6d6d6
| 63951 ||  || — || September 17, 2001 || Socorro || LINEAR || THM || align=right | 4.9 km || 
|-id=952 bgcolor=#E9E9E9
| 63952 ||  || — || September 17, 2001 || Socorro || LINEAR || — || align=right | 4.8 km || 
|-id=953 bgcolor=#d6d6d6
| 63953 ||  || — || September 17, 2001 || Socorro || LINEAR || KOR || align=right | 3.2 km || 
|-id=954 bgcolor=#d6d6d6
| 63954 ||  || — || September 17, 2001 || Socorro || LINEAR || KOR || align=right | 3.3 km || 
|-id=955 bgcolor=#C2FFFF
| 63955 ||  || — || September 17, 2001 || Socorro || LINEAR || L5 || align=right | 22 km || 
|-id=956 bgcolor=#fefefe
| 63956 ||  || — || September 17, 2001 || Socorro || LINEAR || V || align=right | 1.3 km || 
|-id=957 bgcolor=#fefefe
| 63957 ||  || — || September 17, 2001 || Socorro || LINEAR || — || align=right | 1.9 km || 
|-id=958 bgcolor=#fefefe
| 63958 ||  || — || September 17, 2001 || Socorro || LINEAR || FLO || align=right | 2.7 km || 
|-id=959 bgcolor=#E9E9E9
| 63959 ||  || — || September 17, 2001 || Socorro || LINEAR || — || align=right | 5.4 km || 
|-id=960 bgcolor=#d6d6d6
| 63960 ||  || — || September 17, 2001 || Socorro || LINEAR || — || align=right | 7.2 km || 
|-id=961 bgcolor=#E9E9E9
| 63961 ||  || — || September 17, 2001 || Socorro || LINEAR || MAR || align=right | 2.6 km || 
|-id=962 bgcolor=#fefefe
| 63962 ||  || — || September 17, 2001 || Socorro || LINEAR || — || align=right | 1.4 km || 
|-id=963 bgcolor=#fefefe
| 63963 ||  || — || September 17, 2001 || Socorro || LINEAR || — || align=right | 2.1 km || 
|-id=964 bgcolor=#E9E9E9
| 63964 ||  || — || September 17, 2001 || Socorro || LINEAR || — || align=right | 2.7 km || 
|-id=965 bgcolor=#fefefe
| 63965 ||  || — || September 17, 2001 || Socorro || LINEAR || — || align=right | 2.1 km || 
|-id=966 bgcolor=#fefefe
| 63966 ||  || — || September 17, 2001 || Socorro || LINEAR || — || align=right | 3.6 km || 
|-id=967 bgcolor=#fefefe
| 63967 ||  || — || September 17, 2001 || Socorro || LINEAR || V || align=right | 1.9 km || 
|-id=968 bgcolor=#fefefe
| 63968 ||  || — || September 17, 2001 || Socorro || LINEAR || V || align=right | 1.9 km || 
|-id=969 bgcolor=#E9E9E9
| 63969 ||  || — || September 17, 2001 || Socorro || LINEAR || — || align=right | 5.0 km || 
|-id=970 bgcolor=#fefefe
| 63970 ||  || — || September 17, 2001 || Socorro || LINEAR || V || align=right | 2.1 km || 
|-id=971 bgcolor=#E9E9E9
| 63971 ||  || — || September 17, 2001 || Socorro || LINEAR || — || align=right | 4.4 km || 
|-id=972 bgcolor=#fefefe
| 63972 ||  || — || September 17, 2001 || Socorro || LINEAR || FLO || align=right | 1.7 km || 
|-id=973 bgcolor=#d6d6d6
| 63973 ||  || — || September 19, 2001 || Anderson Mesa || LONEOS || 7:4 || align=right | 8.3 km || 
|-id=974 bgcolor=#fefefe
| 63974 ||  || — || September 17, 2001 || Socorro || LINEAR || — || align=right | 1.5 km || 
|-id=975 bgcolor=#fefefe
| 63975 ||  || — || September 17, 2001 || Socorro || LINEAR || V || align=right | 1.2 km || 
|-id=976 bgcolor=#E9E9E9
| 63976 ||  || — || September 19, 2001 || Socorro || LINEAR || — || align=right | 1.6 km || 
|-id=977 bgcolor=#d6d6d6
| 63977 ||  || — || September 20, 2001 || Socorro || LINEAR || HYG || align=right | 8.2 km || 
|-id=978 bgcolor=#fefefe
| 63978 ||  || — || September 20, 2001 || Socorro || LINEAR || — || align=right | 1.5 km || 
|-id=979 bgcolor=#d6d6d6
| 63979 ||  || — || September 20, 2001 || Socorro || LINEAR || — || align=right | 6.0 km || 
|-id=980 bgcolor=#fefefe
| 63980 ||  || — || September 20, 2001 || Socorro || LINEAR || NYS || align=right | 1.4 km || 
|-id=981 bgcolor=#fefefe
| 63981 ||  || — || September 20, 2001 || Socorro || LINEAR || NYS || align=right | 1.3 km || 
|-id=982 bgcolor=#fefefe
| 63982 ||  || — || September 20, 2001 || Socorro || LINEAR || — || align=right | 1.4 km || 
|-id=983 bgcolor=#E9E9E9
| 63983 ||  || — || September 20, 2001 || Socorro || LINEAR || EUN || align=right | 3.9 km || 
|-id=984 bgcolor=#fefefe
| 63984 ||  || — || September 20, 2001 || Socorro || LINEAR || FLO || align=right | 2.2 km || 
|-id=985 bgcolor=#fefefe
| 63985 ||  || — || September 20, 2001 || Socorro || LINEAR || — || align=right | 3.3 km || 
|-id=986 bgcolor=#fefefe
| 63986 ||  || — || September 20, 2001 || Socorro || LINEAR || — || align=right | 2.0 km || 
|-id=987 bgcolor=#E9E9E9
| 63987 ||  || — || September 20, 2001 || Socorro || LINEAR || HNS || align=right | 3.0 km || 
|-id=988 bgcolor=#fefefe
| 63988 ||  || — || September 20, 2001 || Socorro || LINEAR || V || align=right | 1.6 km || 
|-id=989 bgcolor=#E9E9E9
| 63989 ||  || — || September 20, 2001 || Socorro || LINEAR || — || align=right | 5.7 km || 
|-id=990 bgcolor=#d6d6d6
| 63990 ||  || — || September 20, 2001 || Socorro || LINEAR || EOS || align=right | 5.1 km || 
|-id=991 bgcolor=#E9E9E9
| 63991 ||  || — || September 20, 2001 || Socorro || LINEAR || — || align=right | 10 km || 
|-id=992 bgcolor=#E9E9E9
| 63992 ||  || — || September 20, 2001 || Socorro || LINEAR || — || align=right | 3.7 km || 
|-id=993 bgcolor=#fefefe
| 63993 ||  || — || September 20, 2001 || Socorro || LINEAR || — || align=right | 3.3 km || 
|-id=994 bgcolor=#E9E9E9
| 63994 ||  || — || September 20, 2001 || Socorro || LINEAR || CLO || align=right | 4.2 km || 
|-id=995 bgcolor=#fefefe
| 63995 ||  || — || September 20, 2001 || Socorro || LINEAR || — || align=right | 2.5 km || 
|-id=996 bgcolor=#fefefe
| 63996 ||  || — || September 20, 2001 || Socorro || LINEAR || V || align=right | 1.7 km || 
|-id=997 bgcolor=#fefefe
| 63997 ||  || — || September 20, 2001 || Socorro || LINEAR || V || align=right | 1.7 km || 
|-id=998 bgcolor=#d6d6d6
| 63998 ||  || — || September 20, 2001 || Socorro || LINEAR || — || align=right | 7.6 km || 
|-id=999 bgcolor=#d6d6d6
| 63999 ||  || — || September 18, 2001 || Desert Eagle || W. K. Y. Yeung || — || align=right | 6.2 km || 
|-id=000 bgcolor=#E9E9E9
| 64000 ||  || — || September 20, 2001 || Desert Eagle || W. K. Y. Yeung || — || align=right | 4.8 km || 
|}

References

External links 
 Discovery Circumstances: Numbered Minor Planets (60001)–(65000) (IAU Minor Planet Center)

0063